= Starship flight test 10 =

Tenth launch of SpaceX Starship

- Mission type: Flight test
- Operator: SpaceX

Spacecraft properties
- Spacecraft: Ship 37
- Spacecraft type: Starship (Block 2)
- Manufacturer: SpaceX

Start of mission
- Launch date: August 26, 2025, 23:30 UTC (6:30 pm CDT)
- Rocket: Super Heavy (Block 2, B16)
- Launch site: Starbase, OLP-1

End of mission
- Landing date: Super Heavy: August 26, 2025, 23:36:51 UTC (6:36:51 pm CDT); Ship: August 27, 2025, 00:36:30 UTC
- Landing site: Super Heavy: Gulf of Mexico; Ship: Indian Ocean northwest of Western Australia (19°S 107°E)

Orbital parameters
- Perigee altitude: Initial: 2 km (1.2 mi); After relight: 47 km (29 mi)
- Apogee altitude: Initial: 192 km (119 mi); After relight: 220 km (140 mi)
- Inclination: 26.5°

Payload
- 8 Starlink mass simulators
- Mass: ~16,000 kg (35,000 lb)
- Mission patch SpaceX Starship flight tests

Starship flight test 10 was the tenth flight test of a SpaceX Starship launch system, using Booster 16 and Ship 37.

Originally scheduled for no earlier than June 29, 2025, the launch was postponed following the loss of Ship 36, which was destroyed in an explosion during propellant loading for a static fire test in mid-June 2025.

The first launch attempt was scrubbed due to an oxidizer line leak on the ground systems, while the second was called off due to the presence of anvil clouds near the launch site. A third, successful launch attempt occurred on August 26, 2025, at 23:30 UTC (6:30 pm CDT).

== Background ==
=== Impact of Flights 7, 8 and 9 ===
SpaceX faced a series of second-stage failures since flight test 7. During flight test 7, a fire in the aft section of the second stage caused the loss of several engines and ultimately destroyed the vehicle. Investigators later determined that propellant leaks caused by strong harmonic oscillations were the likely root cause.

Flight test 8 ended in a similar failure when an explosion in the aft section during ascent destroyed the vehicle. An internal investigation identified a hardware failure in one of the central Raptor engines as the probable cause.

On flight test 9 the second stage completed its burn and reached its intended trajectory, but multiple failures during the coast phase resulted in a loss of attitude control. The vehicle was passivated, and later objectives were abandoned. It disintegrated upon reentry within the planned descent corridor, ensuring debris fell into the ocean as designed. The FAA closed its investigation into the flight on August 15, 2025, clearing the way for flight test 10.

=== Vehicle testing ahead of launch ===
==== Ship 36 and its explosion ====
Ship 36 was assembled in Mega Bay 2 (MB2) during February and March 2025, and rolled out to the Massey's test site for cryogenic testing on April 26. After completing a full cryogenic test the following day, it returned to MB2 for engine installation before heading back to Massey's in mid-June. On June 16, Ship 36 completed a single-engine static fire. Two days later, as propellant was being loaded for another test, the vehicle exploded. The blast caused severe damage to the test site, and fires burned for several hours. Initial analysis indicated that a nitrogen tank (composite overwrapped pressure vessel) in the nose cone burst below its rated pressure, triggering the destruction. Following the loss of Ship 36, Ship 37 was reassigned to Flight 10.

==== Ship 37 ====
Ship 37's payload bay and nose cone were moved into MB2 on March 15, followed by CH_{4} transfer tubes in April. After cryogenic testing in late May, the vehicle returned for final preparations in early June.

On July 28, Ship 37 rolled to the launch site and was lifted onto Pad 1. It completed a single-engine static fire on July 31 and a six-engine static fire on August 1. The ship was then removed from the orbital launch mount for final checks and tile installation. A new Raptor Vacuum engine was installed on August 4, and the vehicle returned to the pad on August 11.

A spin prime test scheduled for August 12 was aborted due to a supply line leak, but a successful six-engine spin prime test was completed the next day. Ship 37 was then rolled back for final work, including loading Starlink simulators on August 23.

==== Booster 16 ====
Booster 16 completed a cryogenic test on February 28, followed by engine installation in March. It rolled to the launch site in early June and successfully completed a 33-engine static fire on June 6. After additional checks, the booster was moved to Pad 1 and lifted onto the orbital launch mount on August 21.

== Mission profile ==
Attempt	Planned	Result	Turnaround	Reason	Decision point	Weather go (%)	Notes
1	24 Aug 2025, 6:45:00 pm	Scrubbed	—	Technical	24 Aug 2025, 6:13 pm (T−00:39:55)	45%	Ground system oxidizer line leak.
2	25 Aug 2025, 6:59:00 pm	Scrubbed	1 day 0 hours 14 minutes	Weather	25 Aug 2025, 7:02 pm (T−00:00:40 hold)	55%	Anvil clouds in launch area.
3	26 Aug 2025, 6:30:00 pm	Success	0 days 23 hours 31 minutes			55%	

The mission profile for Flight 10 was nearly identical to that of Flight 9, sharing most of the same objectives. Booster 16 performed a directional flip during stage separation and tested an engine-out landing burn scenario. For this test, one of the three center engines was intentionally disabled, and a backup engine from the middle ring of ten successfully performed in its stead. One of the booster's engines shut down shortly after launch, and it did not relight for the boostback or landing burns. After completing its landing burn, the booster briefly hovered over the water before cutting power and splashing into the Gulf of Mexico, where it exploded on impact. The descent used a less aggressive angle of attack than that flown by Booster 14-2 during the previous mission, which had been identified as a factor in 14-2's breakup. Future booster re-entries will also follow a shallower descent profile.

Ship 37 carried and deployed eight Starlink mass simulators and conducted a brief in-space Raptor engine relight test over Africa. Ten minutes later, during re-entry at T+00:47:00 and an altitude of approximately 90 kilometers (56 mi; 49 nmi), an explosion potentially originating from the engine chill lines occurred within the engine compartment, severely damaging Ship 37's aft skirt. It was later determined that this was caused by blocked engine chill lines and a subsequent combustion event. Despite this, and some burn-through at the inner trailing edge of the aft flaps, Ship 37 survived re-entry. After completing its objectives, the ship performed a landing flip and briefly hovered over the Indian Ocean before tipping over into the water, where it exploded on impact. The splashdown was performed within the planned zone and captured on video by a pre-positioned buoy.

=== Flight timeline ===
Time	Event	August 24, 2025	August 25, 2025	August 26, 2025
−01:15:00	Flight director conducts a poll and verifies go for propellant loading	Go for propellant loading	Go for propellant loading	Go for propellant loading
−00:53:00	Starship fuel (liquid methane) load start	Success	Success	Success
−00:45:20	Starship oxidizer (liquid oxygen) load start	Failure; Oxidizer line leak, launch scrubbed at T−00:39:55	Success	Success
−00:41:37	Super Heavy fuel (liquid methane) load start	Success	Success	Success
−00:35:52	Super Heavy oxidizer (liquid oxygen) load start	—N/a	Success	Success
−00:19:40	Super Heavy and Starship engine chill	—N/a	Success	Success
−00:03:20	Starship propellant load complete	—N/a	Success	Success
−00:02:50	Super Heavy propellant load complete	—N/a	Success	Success
−00:00:30	Flight director verifies go for launch	—N/a	Weather, no go for launch Launch scrubbed at T−00:00:40 hold	Go for launch
−00:00:10	Flame deflector activation	—N/a	—N/a	Success
−00:00:03	Super Heavy engine ignition	—N/a	—N/a	Partial failure One engine in the middle ring shut down at T+00:01:33. This engine did not relight for subsequent burns.
+00:00:02	Liftoff	—N/a	—N/a	Success
+00:01:02	Max Q (moment of peak mechanical stress on the rocket)	—N/a	—N/a	Success
+00:02:36	Super Heavy most engines cutoff (MECO)	—N/a	—N/a	Success
+00:02:38	Starship engine ignition and stage separation (hot-staging)	—N/a	—N/a	Success
+00:02:48	Super Heavy boostback burn start	—N/a	—N/a	Success
+00:03:38	Super Heavy boostback burn shutdown	—N/a	—N/a	Success
+00:03:40	Hot-stage jettison	—N/a	—N/a	Success
+00:06:20	Super Heavy landing burn start	—N/a	—N/a	Success
+00:06:40	Super Heavy landing burn shutdown	—N/a	—N/a	Success
+00:08:57	Starship engine cutoff (SECO)	—N/a	—N/a	Success
+00:18:27	Starlink simulator satellites deploy demo start	—N/a	—N/a	Success
+00:25:32	Starlink simulator satellites deploy demo completion	—N/a	—N/a	Success
+00:37:48	Raptor in-space relight demo	—N/a	—N/a	Success
+00:47:29	Starship atmospheric reentry	—N/a	—N/a	Partial failure Vehicle damaged on re-entry
+01:03:15	Starship is transonic	—N/a	—N/a	—N/a
+01:04:30	Starship is subsonic	—N/a	—N/a	—N/a
+01:06:14	Starship landing flip	—N/a	—N/a	Success
+01:06:20	Starship landing burn	—N/a	—N/a	Success
+01:06:30	Starship splashdown	—N/a	—N/a	Success
Source: SpaceX
