= Starship flight 15 =

Fifteenth launch of SpaceX Starship

- The catch of Ship 42 on Starship Flight 15
- Names: Starlink Group 31-2
- Mission type: Satellite deployment
- Operator: SpaceX
- Mission duration: 22 hours, 32 minutes, 32 seconds

Spacecraft properties
- Spacecraft: Ship 42
- Spacecraft type: Starship (Block 3)
- Manufacturer: SpaceX

Start of mission
- Launch date: November 13, 2026, 22:47:36 UTC (4:47:36 pm CST)
- Rocket: Super Heavy (Block 3, B22)
- Launch site: Starbase, OLP-2

End of mission
- Landing date: November 14, 2026, 21:20:08 UTC (3:20:08 pm CST)
- Landing site: Super Heavy B22: Gulf of Mexico; Ship S42: OLP-2, Starbase, TX

Orbital parameters
- Reference system: Geocentric orbit
- Regime: Low Earth orbit
- Perigee altitude: 276 km (171 mi)
- Apogee altitude: 278 km (173 mi)
- Inclination: 30.5°

Payload
- 26 Starlink V3 satellites, including 3 equipped with cameras

Starship flight 15 was the fifteenth launch and the second operational flight of the SpaceX Starship launch system, and the first successful upright landing of a rocket's upper stage after reaching orbit. It launched on November 13, 2026, at 22:47:36 UTC (4:47:36 pm CST) from Orbital Launch Pad 2 at Starbase in Texas, obtaining regulatory approval on launch day.

The mission used Booster 22 and Ship 42 as the fourth pair of Block 3 vehicles to fly. SpaceX planned to catch both the ship and the Super Heavy booster with a launch tower, aiming for the first catch of a Starship upper stage, the first catch of a Block 3 booster, and the first recovery of every stage of an orbital rocket on a single flight.

Ship 42 reached low Earth orbit, deployed all 26 Starlink V3 satellites and remained in orbit for more than 22 hours, the longest Starship flight to date. It then returned to Starbase, where it was caught by the arms of the launch tower at Pad 2 at 3:20 pm CST on November 14, 2026, the first recovery of a Starship upper stage from orbit. Booster 22 completed its ascent and boostback, but its automated return criteria called off the tower catch and diverted it to a contingency splashdown site in the Gulf of Mexico, where it was destroyed.

== Background ==
=== Flight 14 ===
Flight 15 followed Starship's first orbital and operational payload mission. During Flight 14, Booster 21 completed ascent, hot staging, a boostback burn and a controlled splashdown in the Gulf of Mexico. Ship 41 reached orbit despite the early shutdown of one of its three Raptor Vacuum engines and subsequently deployed all 26 Starlink V3 satellites carried by the mission.

SpaceX shortened Flight 14's originally planned multi-orbit coast following the engine shutdown. The spacecraft subsequently performed a controlled deorbit, atmospheric reentry and a splashdown in the Pacific Ocean. The mission demonstrated orbital insertion and deployment of multiple operational satellites before Flight 15's planned expansion of Starship recovery objectives.

=== Vehicle preparation ===
==== Booster 22 ====
Booster 22 was a Block 3 Super Heavy booster which served as the first stage for Flight 15. The booster was moved from Mega Bay 1 to the Massey's test site in September 2026 for cryogenic proof testing as SpaceX prepared the Flight 15 vehicle pair in parallel with the Flight 14 campaign.

On October 25, Booster 22 performed a full-duration static fire of all 33 engines at Orbital Launch Pad 2. It was moved back to the pad on November 10, where it was used for final catch testing, including a squeeze test in which the booster was held by the tower arms at catch height. Booster 22 was planned to be the first Block 3 booster to return to Starbase and be caught by the tower.

==== Ship 42 ====
Ship 42 is a Block 3 Starship spacecraft which serves as the upper stage flown on Flight 15. The ship is inscribed with the words Don't Panic in addition to its number. This refers to the phrase on the cover of the guidebook in Douglas Adams's The Hitchhiker's Guide to the Galaxy, in which the number 42 is the answer to "the Ultimate Question of Life, the Universe, and Everything".

The vehicle completed multiple cryogenic test campaigns at Massey's before being transported to Orbital Launch Pad 2 for a series of catch-related tests on September 11 and 12. During the testing, Ship 42 was lifted and supported by the launch tower's chopstick arms in a simulated post-catch position. The vehicle was also positioned against the ship quick-disconnect arm while suspended by the chopsticks, testing hardware and procedures intended to support an eventual recovery of Starship directly at the launch tower.

In October, Ship 42 returned to Massey's with its engines removed for a third round of cryogenic proof testing. After its engines were reinstalled, the ship performed a single-engine static fire simulating a deorbit burn on October 26, followed by a static fire of all six engines lasting over 60 seconds on October 27. Ship 42 was rolled out to the launch site on November 12. On November 14, it became the first ship to be caught by a launch tower.

Pre-launch milestones
Date	Vehicle	Milestone
September 2026	Booster 22	Moved from Mega Bay 1 to Massey's for cryogenic proof testing
September 11–12	Ship 42	Lifted by the chopsticks at Orbital Launch Pad 2 in a simulated post-catch position and positioned against the ship quick-disconnect arm
October 9	Ship 42	Returned to Massey's with its engines removed for a third round of cryogenic proof testing
October 25	Booster 22	Full-duration static fire of all 33 engines at Orbital Launch Pad 2
October 26	Ship 42	Single-engine static fire at Massey's, simulating a deorbit burn
October 27	Ship 42	Six-engine static fire at Massey's, lasting over 60 seconds
November 7	Both	SpaceX releases the details of the flight and targets a launch on November 13
November 10	Booster 22	Moved to Orbital Launch Pad 2 for final catch testing, including a squeeze test at catch height
November 12	Ship 42	Rolled out to the launch site
November 13	Both	The FAA issued the launch license for the flight

=== Regulatory approval ===
The Federal Aviation Administration (FAA) license for Flight 14 covered only that flight, so Flight 15 required a license modification, including permission for Ship 42 to return to Starbase on a trajectory which overflies populated areas. In October, SpaceX president Gwynne Shotwell said that she expected the license to cover a return to launch site and tower catch for both stages. On November 12, the day before liftoff was planned, the launch was still pending regulatory approval. On November 13, 2026, the FAA issued a launch license for Flight 15, including the return of both stages.

== Mission profile ==
In September, Elon Musk stated that a successful Flight 14 could clear the way for a ship-catch attempt on Flight 15 and estimated the probability of success on the first attempt at "at least 50 or 60 percent".

NASASpaceflight subsequently described Flight 15 as the first realistic opportunity for a Starship catch and, in a best-case scenario, a simultaneous recovery of both Booster 22 and Ship 42 at Pad 2. On October 20, during SpaceX's third-quarter earnings call, Musk confirmed that a catch of both the booster and the ship would be attempted. On October 29, he stated that Ship 42 would be the first ship caught by the tower. On November 7, 2026, SpaceX released the details for Flight 15. According to SpaceX, a successful flight would be "the first full recovery of an orbital launch system": the booster was planned to be caught by the tower at Pad 2 about six and a half minutes after liftoff.

The flight launched from Orbital Launch Pad 2 at Starbase during a 75-minute window opening at 22:45 UTC (4:45 pm local time) on November 13, and placed Ship 42 into a low Earth orbit at an altitude of about 275 km (171 mi). The ship successfully deployed 26 Starlink V3 satellites over a period of around 42 minutes; payload deployment ended at approximately T+01:17:30. Three of the satellites carried cameras, which were used to photograph the ship's heat shield for inspection. The ship was then placed on a coasting trajectory for the next 21 hours and completed roughly 14 orbits around Earth before performing a deorbit burn to reenter the atmosphere and be caught by the tower.

Both the ship and booster had contingency landing options should they or the tower be deemed no-go for catch. For the booster, the same criteria were in place as for Flight 5 in 2024 and every flight with a planned booster catch since then: if a violation of criteria for catch were to be detected on either booster, launch pad or both, the booster is commanded to divert from the launch site, so it can be safely disposed of in a designated spot over the Gulf of Mexico. Like Flight 14, the ship was initially to be placed on a passively safe suborbital trajectory and would only enter orbit if it is deemed healthy enough. Upon entering orbit, the ship had three options to deorbit early; two near Hawaii and one near Chile. When the ship was committed to its planned deorbit burn at the nominal end of the mission, it initially targeted a region in the Pacific Ocean several thousand kilometers west of Starbase while using its flaps to extend its glide towards Starbase, flying around populated areas in northern Mexico and southern Texas. Flight controllers had multiple options to end reentry early and safely by tumbling the ship in a controlled manner to ensure it would burn up. After reentry, there was a contingency landing option in the Gulf should a tower catch be called off.

During its return, the booster's onboard checks called off the catch and it diverted to its contingency landing site, as designed. SpaceX spokesperson Dan Huot initially attributed the abort to a guidance, navigation and control (GNC) issue, but later said that the GNC system had performed well. Musk said that the booster's engines had slightly underperformed, leaving it with too little propellant for a catch. The booster lit 13 engines for its landing burn and hovered above the water before shutting down and briefly exhibiting a green engine rich plume; its flight termination system was then triggered, and it was destroyed just above the surface of the Gulf. The ship passed all checkpoints and completed its entire planned trajectory of approximately 14 Earth orbits. After roughly 22 hours and 30 minutes of continued flight, Ship 42 returned to its launch site at Pad 2 in adequate health to be caught by the launch tower's arms at T+22:32:30.

== Aftermath ==
SpaceX described the flight as having "changed everything". NASA Administrator Jared Isaacman congratulated the company, writing that it was "making more believers by the day". A day earlier, he had said that NASA looked forward to using Starlink capability in orbit on Artemis III. CBS News reported that the catch marked a major milestone toward the first fully reusable orbital rocket, while noting that SpaceX still needed to show the reliability required for crewed flights and to demonstrate refueling in orbit, which it planned to begin testing within the next several flights.

Musk attributed the loss of Booster 22 to the slight underperformance of its engines. He said that the fix was to improve engine performance and consistency, which was already under way with Raptor V3.2, and to cut off most of the booster's engines about one second earlier so that enough propellant remained for boostback and landing. He added that the early vehicles had already been superseded by improved designs and that the booster loss would not change the company's timeline for "high volume, fully reusable Starship flights", while cautioning that initial conclusions were often wrong to some degree and that a full review of the telemetry was needed. He also said that the next booster was almost ready to fly, and that damage to the tower or launch mount could have cost two to three months.

Flight 16 is expected to use Ship 43 and Booster 23, and to be the first Starship launch from Launch Complex 39A in Florida.

== Flight timeline ==
Flight 15 had a pre-launch timeline similar to that of Flight 14 and previous V3 flights. The flight itself was different in terms of length, booster landing, and ship landing.

Time	Event	November 13
−00:50:00	Flight director conducts a poll and verifies go for propellant loading	Go for propellant loading
−00:35:33	Booster oxidizer (liquid oxygen) load start	Success
−00:35:30	Booster fuel (liquid methane) load start	Success
−00:35:12	Ship oxidizer load start	Success
−00:35:11	Ship fuel load start	Success
−00:21:40	Super Heavy and Starship engine chill	Success
−00:02:50	Booster propellant load complete	Success
−00:02:10	Ship propellant load complete	Success
−00:00:30	Flight director conducts a poll and verifies go for launch	Go for launch
−00:00:17	Flame diverter activation	Success
−00:00:03	Super Heavy engine ignition	Success
00:00:00	Liftoff	Success
+00:00:58	Throttle down for max q during ascent (moment of peak mechanical stress on the rocket)	Success
+00:02:19	Super Heavy MECO (most engines cut off)	Success
+00:02:21	Hot-staging (Starship Raptor ignition and stage separation)	Success
+00:02:26	Super Heavy boostback burn start	Partial success (32 of 33 engines re-lit)
+00:03:02	Super Heavy boostback burn shutdown	Success
+00:06:10	Super Heavy landing burn start	Success
+00:06:35	Super Heavy landing burn engine shutdown	Success
+00:06:35	Tower landing and catch	Aborted; Offshore automatic divert (aborted landing and catch)
+00:08:09	Starship engine cutoff	Success
+00:26:10	Starship orbital insertion burn start	Success
+00:26:30	Starship orbital insertion burn shutdown	Success
+00:35:01	Payload deploy start	Success
+01:17:40	Payload deploy complete	Success
+01:27:46	Early Hawaii Return Check	Checkpoint passed
+07:15:35	Mid Chile Return Check	Checkpoint passed
+20:41:55	Final Hawaii Return Check	Checkpoint passed
+21:35:57	Deorbit burn start	Success
+21:36:07	Deorbit burn shutdown	Success
+22:10:46	Starship entry	Success
+22:29:34	Starship is transonic	Success
+22:30:13	Starship is subsonic	Success
+22:32:16	Landing burn start	Success
+22:32:18	Landing flip	Success
+22:32:21	Landing burn 3 to 2 engines	Success
+22:32:27	Landing burn 2 to 1 engine	Success
+22:32:28	Starship landing burn shutdown and catch	Success; Caught on Orbital Launch Pad 2 at SpaceX Starbase
Source: SpaceX

== See also ==
- List of Starship launches
- SpaceX Starship development
- SpaceX reusable launch system development program
