= Flight 9 =

Flight 9 or Flight 009 may refer to:

- Air France Flight 009, a controlled flight into terrain accident on October 28, 1949
- Trans-Canada Air Lines Flight 9, a mid-air collision on April 8, 1954
- British Airways Flight 009, engine flame-out due to volcanic ash on June 24, 1982
- Starship flight test 9, an unsuccessful test flight of the SpaceX Starship rocket in May 2025
