= SpaceX Starbase =

SpaceX private launch site

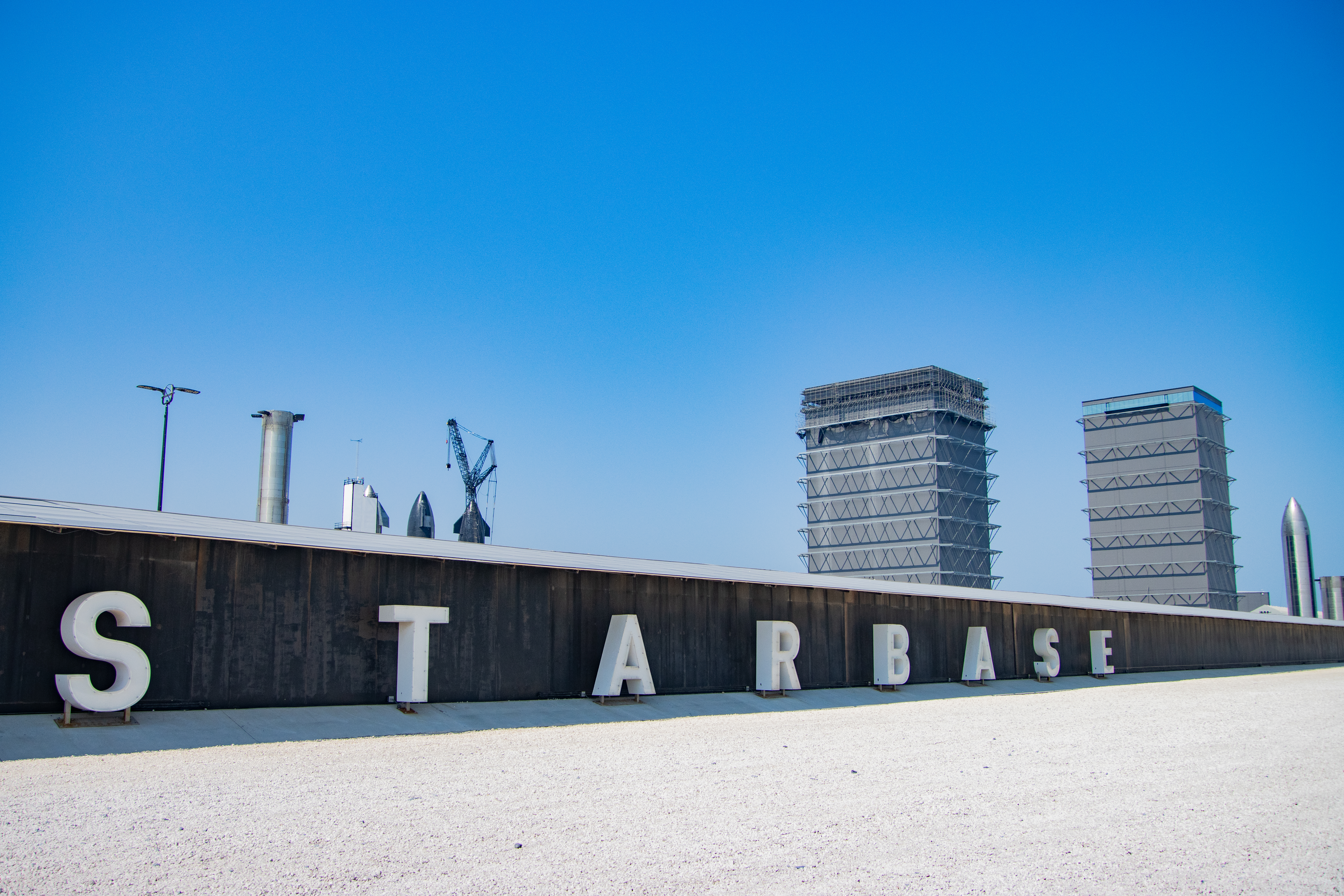
- Starbase sign with Starship production site in the background
- Interactive map of SpaceX Starbase
- Location: Starbase, Texas, United States
- Coordinates: 25°59′15″N 97°11′11″W
- Time zone: Central
- Established: 2014; 12 years ago
- Operator: SpaceX
- Launch pad(s): 1 under construction, 1 active
OLP-1 launch history
- Status: Inactive
- Launches: 11
- First launch: April 20, 2023 (Flight test 1)
- Last launch: October 13, 2025 (Flight test 11)
- Associated rockets: Starship
OLP-1 landing history
- Landings: 3
- First landing: October 13, 2024 (Flight test 5)
- Last landing: March 6, 2025 (Flight test 8)
- Associated rockets: Starship
OLP-2 launch history
- Status: Active
- Launches: 4
- First launch: May 22, 2026 (Flight test 12)
- Last launch: November 13, 2026 (Flight 15 - Starlink 31-2)
- Associated rockets: Starship
OLP-2 landing history
- Landings: 1
- First landing: November 14, 2026 (Flight 15 - Starlink 31-2)
- Associated rockets: Starship

SpaceX Starbase, previously known as SpaceX South Texas Launch Site and SpaceX private launch site, is an industrial complex and rocket launch facility that serves as the main testing and production location for Starship launch vehicles, as well as the headquarters of the American space technology company SpaceX. Located in Starbase, Texas, United States, and adjacent to South Padre Island, Texas, Starbase has been under near-continuous development since the late 2010s, and comprises a spaceport near the Gulf of Mexico, a production facility, and a test site along Texas State Highway 4.

When initially conceptualized in the early 2010s, its stated purpose was "to provide SpaceX an exclusive launch site that would allow the company to accommodate its launch manifest and meet tight launch windows." The launch site was originally intended to support launches of the Falcon 9 and Falcon Heavy launch vehicles as well as "a variety of reusable suborbital launch vehicles". In early 2018, SpaceX announced a change of plans, stating that the launch site would now be used exclusively for SpaceX's next-generation launch vehicle, Starship. Between 2018 and 2020, the site added significant rocket production and test capacity. SpaceX chief executive officer (CEO) Elon Musk indicated in 2014 that he expected "commercial astronauts, private astronauts, to be departing from South Texas", and eventually launching spacecraft to Mars from the site.

Between 2012 and 2014, SpaceX considered seven potential locations around the United States for the new commercial launch facility. For much of this period, a parcel of land adjacent to Boca Chica Beach near Brownsville, Texas, was the leading candidate location, during an extended period while the U.S. Federal Aviation Administration (FAA) conducted an extensive environmental assessment on the use of the Texas location as a launch site. Also during this period, SpaceX began acquiring land in the area, purchasing approximately 41 acres (170,000 m^{2}) and leasing 57 acres (230,000 m^{2}) by July 2014. SpaceX announced in August 2014 that they had selected the location near Brownsville as the location for the new non-governmental launch site after the final environmental assessment was completed and environmental agreements were in place by July 2014. In 2023, the first flight test of Starship made it SpaceX's fourth orbital-class launch facility following three launch locations that are leased from the US government.

SpaceX conducted a groundbreaking ceremony on the new launch facility in September 2014, and soil preparation began in October 2015. The first tracking antenna was installed in August 2016 and the first propellant tank arrived in July 2018. In late 2018, construction ramped up and the site saw the fabrication of the first 9 m-diameter (30 ft) prototype test vehicle, Starhopper, which was tested and flown March–August 2019. Through 2021, additional prototype flight vehicles were being built at the facility for higher-altitude tests. By late 2023, over 2,100 full-time employees were working at the site.

The development of Starship has resulted in several lawsuits against the FAA and SpaceX from environmental groups. Some conservationists have expressed concern over the impact of Starship's development in Boca Chica, Texas, on species like the critically endangered Kemp's ridley sea-turtle, nearby wildlife habitats and national-refuge land.

On December 12, 2024, SpaceX filed an official request to Cameron County authorities to have an area that includes the site incorporated as a new city, named Starbase. On February 13, 2025, Cameron County judge Eddie Treviño ordered an election on the incorporation petition to be held on May 3. Voters approved incorporating the new city as Starbase, Texas on May 3, 2025. Starbase, Texas, is the first new city in Cameron County since the incorporation of Los Indios in 1995.

== History ==
Private discussions between SpaceX and state officials about a private launch site began at least as early as 2011. SpaceX chief executive officer Elon Musk mentioned interest in a private launch site for commercial launches in a September 2011 speech.

In 2012, Fredrick (Rick) Jenet, director of the Center for Advanced Radio Astronomy (CARA) and an associate professor of physics and astronomy at the University of Texas at Brownsville, proposed to install the STARGATE in Boca Chica (initial funding included US$500,000 in seed money provided by the Greater Brownsville Incentives Corporation in October 2012) as part of a package to increase the likelihood of attracting SpaceX to build a launch site in the area. The goal was also for students and faculty to be hands-on and assist with launches and space exploration, which was viewed as a rare opportunity.

The company announced in August 2014 that they had chosen Texas as the location for their SpaceX South Texas launch site. Site soil work began in 2015 and major construction of facilities began in late-2018, with rocket engine testing and flight testing beginning in 2019.

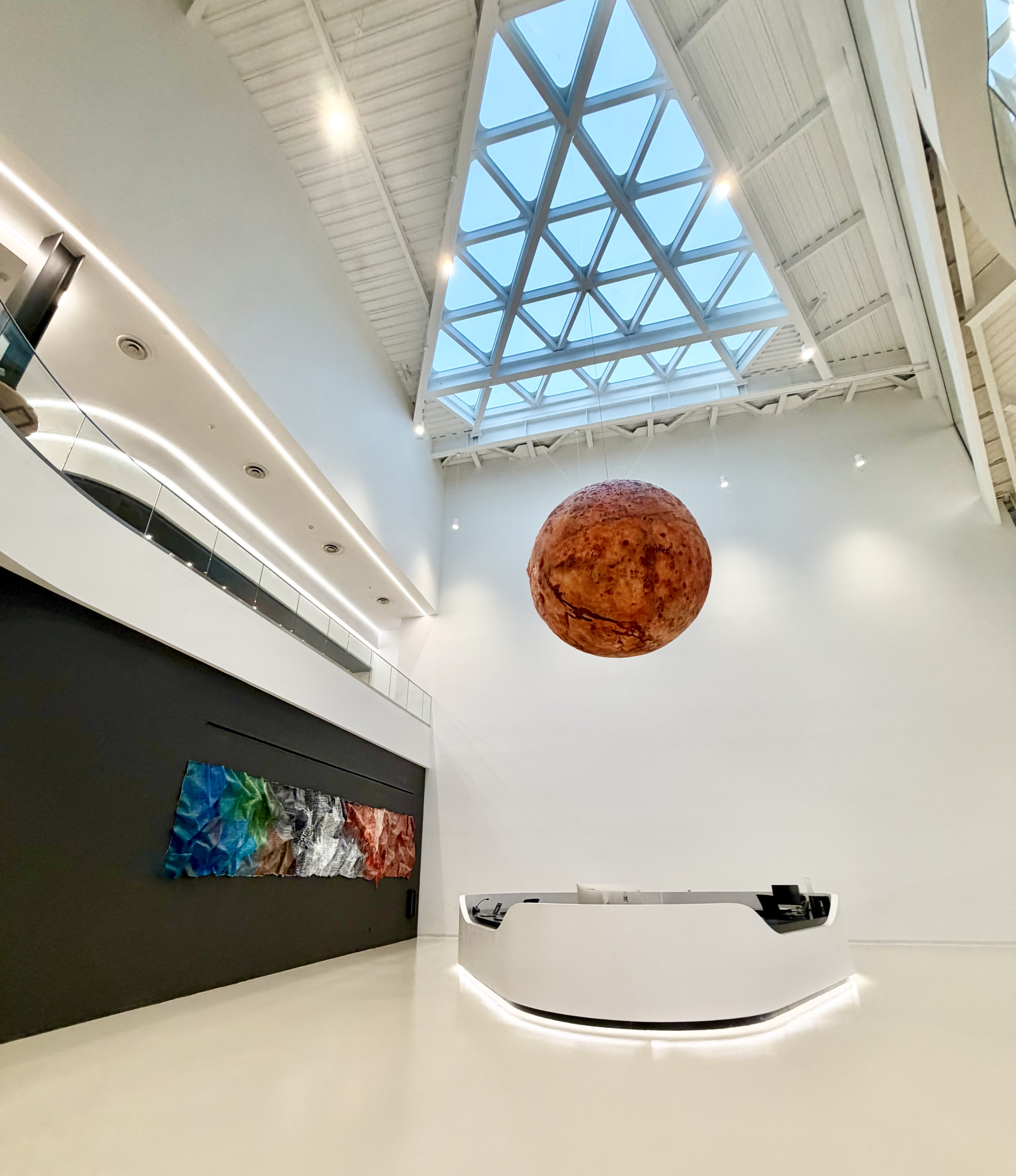
Interior of the Starbase building

The name Starbase began to be used more widely by SpaceX and news media after March 2021, when SpaceX had some discussions described as a "casual enquiry" about incorporating a city in Texas to be called Starbase. Separate from the putative city, by early 2022, the Starbase moniker for the SpaceX facilities in South Texas had become common. The SpaceX site has also been called the "Gateway to Mars", including in a sign to that effect outside the launch site.

Starbase is also used sometimes to describe the region of the Boca Chica subdelta peninsula surrounding the SpaceX facilities; see Boca Chica (Texas) § Plans for new city. In January 2024, Cameron County and Brownsville officials both passed resolutions requesting the federal government to recognize "Starbase" as an official place name for the area.

=== Launch site selection and environmental assessment ===
As early as April 2007, at least five potential locations were publicly known, including "sites in Alaska, California, Florida, Texas and Virginia." In September 2012, it became clear that Georgia and Puerto Rico were also interested in pursuing the new SpaceX commercial spaceport facility. The Camden County, Georgia, Joint Development Authority voted unanimously in November 2012 to "explore developing an aerospaceport facility" at an Atlantic coastal site to support both horizontal and vertical launch operations. The main Puerto Rico site under consideration was the former Roosevelt Roads Naval Station. By September 2012, SpaceX was considering seven potential locations around the United States for the new commercial launch pad. Since then, the leading candidate location for the new facility was a parcel of land adjacent to Boca Chica Beach near Brownsville, Texas.

By early 2013, Texas remained the leading candidate for the location of the new SpaceX commercial launch facility, although Florida, Georgia, and other locations remained in the running. Legislation was introduced by the Texas Legislature to enable temporary closure of state beaches during launches, limit liability for noise and other commercial spaceflight risks, as well as considering a package of incentives to encourage SpaceX to locate at Brownsville, Texas. 2013 economic estimates showed SpaceX investing approximately US$100 million in the development and construction of the facility. A US$15 million incentive package was approved by the Texas Legislature in 2013.

In April 2012, the FAA's Office of Commercial Space Transportation initiated a Notice of Intent to conduct an environmental impact statement (EIS) and public hearings on the new launch site, which would be located in Cameron County, Texas. The summary then indicated that the Texas site would support up to 12 commercial launches per year, including two Falcon Heavy launches. The first public meeting was held in May 2012, and the FAA released a draft EIS for the location in South Texas in April 2013. Public hearings on the draft EIS occurred in Brownsville, followed by a public comment period ending in June 2013. The draft EIS identified three parcels of land—a total of 12.4 acres (5.0 ha)—that would notionally be used for the control center. In addition, SpaceX had leased 56.6 acres (22.9 ha) of land adjacent to the terminus of Texas State Highway 4, 20 acres (8.1 ha) of which would be used to develop the vertical launch area; the remainder would remain open space surrounding the launch facility. In July 2014, the FAA officially issued its Record of Decision concerning the Boca Chica Beach facility, and found that "the proposal by Elon Musk's Space Exploration Technologies would have no significant impact on the environment," approving the proposal and outlining SpaceX's proposal. The company formally announced selection of the Texas location in August 2014.

In September 2013, the Texas General Land Office (GLO) and Cameron County signed an agreement outlining how beach closures would be handled in order to support a future SpaceX launch schedule. The agreement is intended to enable both economic development in Cameron County and protect the public's right to have access to Texas state beaches. Under the 2013 Texas plan, beach closures would be allowed but were not expected to exceed a maximum of 15 hours per closure date, with no more than three scheduled space flights between the Saturday prior to Memorial Day and Labor Day, unless the Texas GLO approves.

In 2019, the FAA completed a reevaluation of the SpaceX facilities in South Texas, and in particular the revised plans away from a commercial spaceport to more of a spaceship yard for building and testing rockets at the facility, as well as flying different rockets—SpaceX Starship and prototype test vehicles—from the site than the Falcon 9 and Falcon Heavy envisioned in the original 2014 environmental assessment. In May and August 2019, the FAA issued a written report with a decision that a new supplemental EIS would not be required. In May 2021, the FAA issued a written FAQ regarding the FAA's Environmental Review of SpaceX Starship/Super Heavy Operations at the Boca Chica Launch Site.

Throughout 2022, Starship's first integrated flight test was delayed extensively, due to delays in the FAA issuing a license, to allow findings on environmental impact. On June 13, 2022, the FAA announced that Starbase was not creating a significant impact on the environment, yet listed more than 75 actions to be taken before review for an orbital launch license. Some of these actions included a $5,000 contribution to wildlife nonprofits in the area, making sure roadways stay open on certain days of the year, and actions to protect local sea turtle populations.

=== Land acquisition ===
Prior to a final decision on the location of the spaceport, SpaceX began purchasing a number of real estate properties in Cameron County, Texas, beginning in June 2012. By July 2014, SpaceX had purchased approximately 41 acres (170,000 m^{2}) and leased 57 acres (230,000 m^{2}) near Boca Chica Village and Boca Chica Beach through a company named Dogleg Park LLC, a reference to the "dogleg" type of trajectory that rockets launched from Boca Chica will be required to follow.

Prior to May 2013, five lots in the Spanish Dagger Subdivision in Boca Chica Village, adjacent to Highway 4 which leads to the proposed launch site, had been purchased. In May 2013, SpaceX purchased an additional three parcels, adding another 1 acre (4,000 m^{2}), plus four more lots with a total of 1.9 acres (7,700 m^{2}) in July 2013, making a total of 12 SpaceX-purchased lots. In November 2013, SpaceX substantially "increased its land holdings in the Boca Chica Beach area from 12 lots to 72 undeveloped lots" purchased, which encompass a total of approximately 24 acres (97,000 m^{2}), in addition to the 56.5 acres (229,000 m^{2}) leased from private property owners. An additional few acres were purchased late in 2013, raising the SpaceX total "from 72 undeveloped lots to 80 lots totaling about 26 acres." In late 2013, SpaceX completed a replat of 13 lots totaling 8.3 acres (34,000 m^{2}) into a subdivision that they have named "Mars Crossing."

In February 2014, they purchased 28 additional lots that surround the proposed complex at Boca Chica Beach, raising the SpaceX-owned land to approximately 36 acres (150,000 m^{2}) in addition to the 56-acre (230,000 m^{2}) lease. SpaceX's investments in Cameron County continued in March 2014, with the purchase of more tracts of land, bringing the total number of lots it owned to 90. Public records showed that the total land area that SpaceX then owned through Dogleg Park LLC was roughly 37 acres (150,000 m^{2}). This is in addition to 56.5 acres (229,000 m^{2}) that SpaceX then had under lease. By September 2014, Dogleg Park completed a replat of lots totaling 49.3 acres (200,000 m^{2}) into a second subdivision, this one named "Launch Site Texas", made up of several parcels of property previously purchased. This is the site of the launch site itself while the launch control facility is planned two miles west in the Mars Crossing subdivision. Dogleg Park had also continued purchasing land in Boca Chica, and by September 2014 owned a total of "87 lots equaling more than 100 acres".

SpaceX has also bought and is modifying several residential properties in Boca Chica Village, but apparently planning to leave them in residential use, about 2 miles (3.2 km) west of the launch site.

In September 2019, SpaceX extended an offer to buy each of the houses in Boca Chica Village for three times the fair market value along with an offer of VIP invitations to future launch events. The 3x offer was said to be "non-negotiable." Homeowners were given two weeks for this particular offer to remain valid.

In January 2024, the Texas Parks and Wildlife Department announced a proposal to transfer 43 acres of Boca Chica State Park lands to SpaceX, in exchange for 477 new acres to be added to the Laguna Atascosa National Wildlife Refuge.

=== Construction ===
Major site construction at SpaceX's launch site in Boca Chica began in 2016, with site soil preparation for the launch pad in a process said to take two years, with significant additional soil work and significant construction beginning in late 2018. By September 2019, the site had been "transformed into an operational launch site – outfitted with the ground support equipment needed to support test flights of the methane-fueled Starship vehicles." Lighter construction of fencing and temporary buildings in the control center area had begun in 2014.

The Texas launch location was projected in the 2013 draft EIS to include a 20 acres (81,000 m^{2}) vertical launch area and a 12.2 acres (49,000 m^{2}) area for a launch control center and a launch pad directly adjacent to the eastern terminus of Texas State Highway 4. Changes occurred based on actual land SpaceX was able to purchase and replat for the control center and primary spaceship build yard.

SpaceX broke ground on the new launch site in September 2014, but indicated then that the principal work to build the facility was not expected to ramp up until late 2015 after the SpaceX launch site development team completed work on Kennedy Space Center Launch Pad 39A, as the same team was expected to manage the work to build the Boca Chica facility. Advance preparation work was expected to commence ahead of that. As of 2014, SpaceX anticipated spending approximately US$100 million over three to four years to build the Texas facility, while the Texas state government expected to spend US$15 million to extend utilities and infrastructure to support the new spaceport.

The design phase for the facility was completed by March 2015. Construction was delayed by the destruction of one of SpaceX two Florida launch facilities in a September 2016 rocket explosion, which delayed the launch site design/build team for over a year.

In order to stabilize the waterlogged ground at the coastal site, SpaceX engineers determined that a process known as soil surcharging would be required. For this to happen, some 310,000 cubic yards (240,000 m^{3}) of new soil was trucked to the facility between October 2015 and January 2016. In January 2016, following additional soil testing that revealed foundation problems, SpaceX indicated they were not planning to complete construction until 2017, and the first launch from Boca Chica was not expected until late 2018. In February 2016, SpaceX President and Chief Operating Officer (COO) Gwynne Shotwell stated that construction had been delayed by poor soil stability at the site, and that "two years of dirt work" would be required before SpaceX could build the launch facility, with construction costs expected to be higher than previously estimated. The first phase of the soil stabilization process was completed by May 2016.

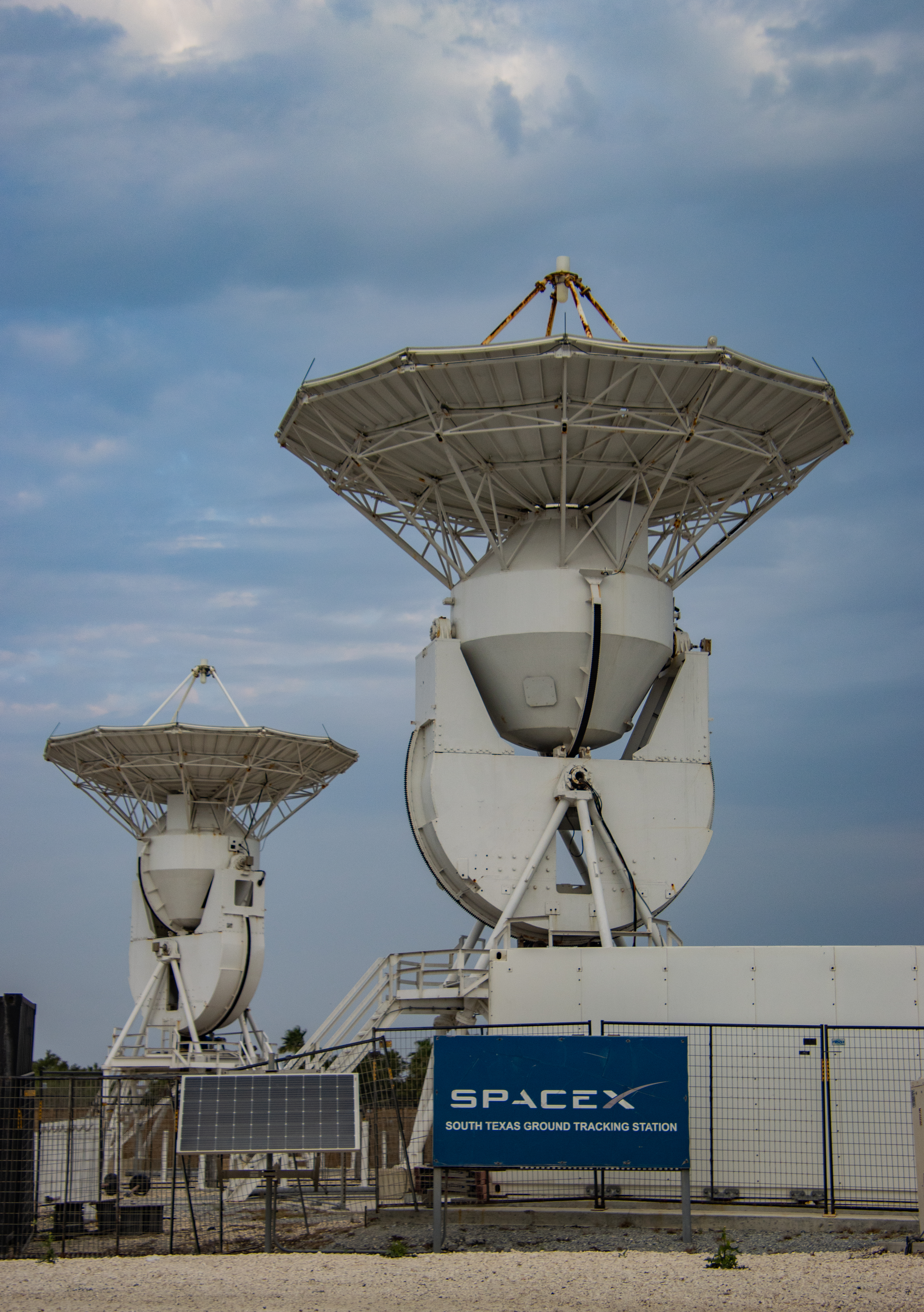
Ground tracking station antennas installed at the control center

Two 9 m (30 ft) S-band tracking station antennas were installed at the site in 2016–2017. They were formerly used to track the Space Shuttle during launch and landing and made operational as tracking resources for crewed Dragon missions in 2018.

A SpaceX-owned 6.5-acre (26,000 m^{2}) photovoltaic power station was installed on site to provide off-grid electrical power near the control center, The solar farm was installed by SolarCity in January 2018.

Progress on building the pad had slowed considerably through 2017, much slower than either SpaceX or Texas state officials had expected when it was announced in 2014. Support for SpaceX, however, remained fairly strong amongst Texas public officials. In January 2018, COO Shotwell said the pad might be used for "early vehicle testing" by late 2018 or early 2019 but that additional work would be required after that to make it into a full launch site. SpaceX achieved this new target, with prototype rocket and rocket engine ground testing at Boca Chica starting in March 2019, and suborbital flight tests starting in July 2019.

In late 2018 the rate of construction increased, and the site saw the development of a large propellant tank farm including a 95,000 gallon horizontal liquid oxygen tank and 80,000 gallon liquid methane tank, a gas flare, more offices, and a small flat square launch pad. The Starhopper prototype was relocated to the pad in March 2019, and first flew in late July 2019.

By September 2019, the facility had been transformed into a new phase of an industrial rocket build facility, with workers working multiple shifts and more than five days a week, able to support large rocket ground and flight testing. In November 2019 the SpaceX South Texas Launch Site crew was working on a new launch pad for its Starship/Super Heavy rocket; the former launch site was transformed to an assembly site for the Starship rocket.

On March 7, 2021, it was revealed by Michael Baylor on Twitter that the SpaceX South Texas Launch Site may eventually expand to the south. The expansion could see the addition of two suborbital test stands along with one orbital launch pad named Orbital Launch Mount B. The expansion could also include a new landing pad, an expansion to the existing tank farm, a new tank farm situated next to the proposed Orbital Launch Mount B, expanded Suborbital Pad B decking and two integration towers situated to under-construction Orbital Launch Mount A and the proposed Orbital Launch Mount B.

In March 2021, SpaceX received a "Determination of no hazard to air navigation" from the FAA for the 146 m (479 ft) launch tower that SpaceX was building to support orbital launches. The period of construction shown on the FAA documents was April–July 2021 but the expiration date on the regulatory approval was September 18, 2021.

The launch tower was fully stacked by late July 2021, when a crane lifted the ninth and final large steel section to the top of the tower at the orbital launch site (OLS). The tower is designed to have a set of large arms attached which is used to stack both Super Heavy and the Starship second stage on the adjacent launch mount and catch the rocket on return to the launch site. There is no separate large crane attached to the top of the tower. The launch mount ("Stage Zero") began construction in July 2020, when the rebar of the deep foundation began to rise above the ground. Soon six large steel circular launch supports were erected which would eventually support the massive weight of the launch table some ten months later. The mount was built to full height on July 31, 2021, with the rollout and craning into place of the 370 t (370,000 kg; 820,000 lb) launch table, which had been custom built at the manufacturing site over the preceding months.

Musk has commented that Stage Zero would be all that is necessary to both launch and catch the rocket, and that building it is at least as difficult as the booster or ship. As of August 2, 2021, launch mount and launch tower plumbing, electrical, and ground support equipment connections were yet to be completed. Soon after tests for Starships were paused, production started to ramp up for the first orbital test flight. SpaceX workers started building ground support equipment tanks, cryogenic shells, Starship SN20, and Super Heavy Booster 4. As SN20 was completed, and Booster 4 and SN20 were rolled out to the launch site for a full stack. On August 6, 2021, SN20 was stacked on top of Booster 4 for fit checks and compatibility testing with the tower. SpaceX workers soon took SN20 and Booster 4 back to the production site.

On April 20, 2023, Starbase hosted the first launch of the fully stacked Ship 24/Booster 7. The launch ended in an uncontrolled spin due to ignited propellant leaks in the engine control systems, and the rocket's flight termination system (AFTS) failed to immediately destroy the vehicle, with the booster firing for an additional 40 seconds before breaking apart, demising at 29km, without reaching the planned suborbital trajectory. Prior to the launch, Musk had said that if the rocket were to get "far enough away from the launchpad before something goes wrong, then I think I would consider that to be a success."

=== Operation ===
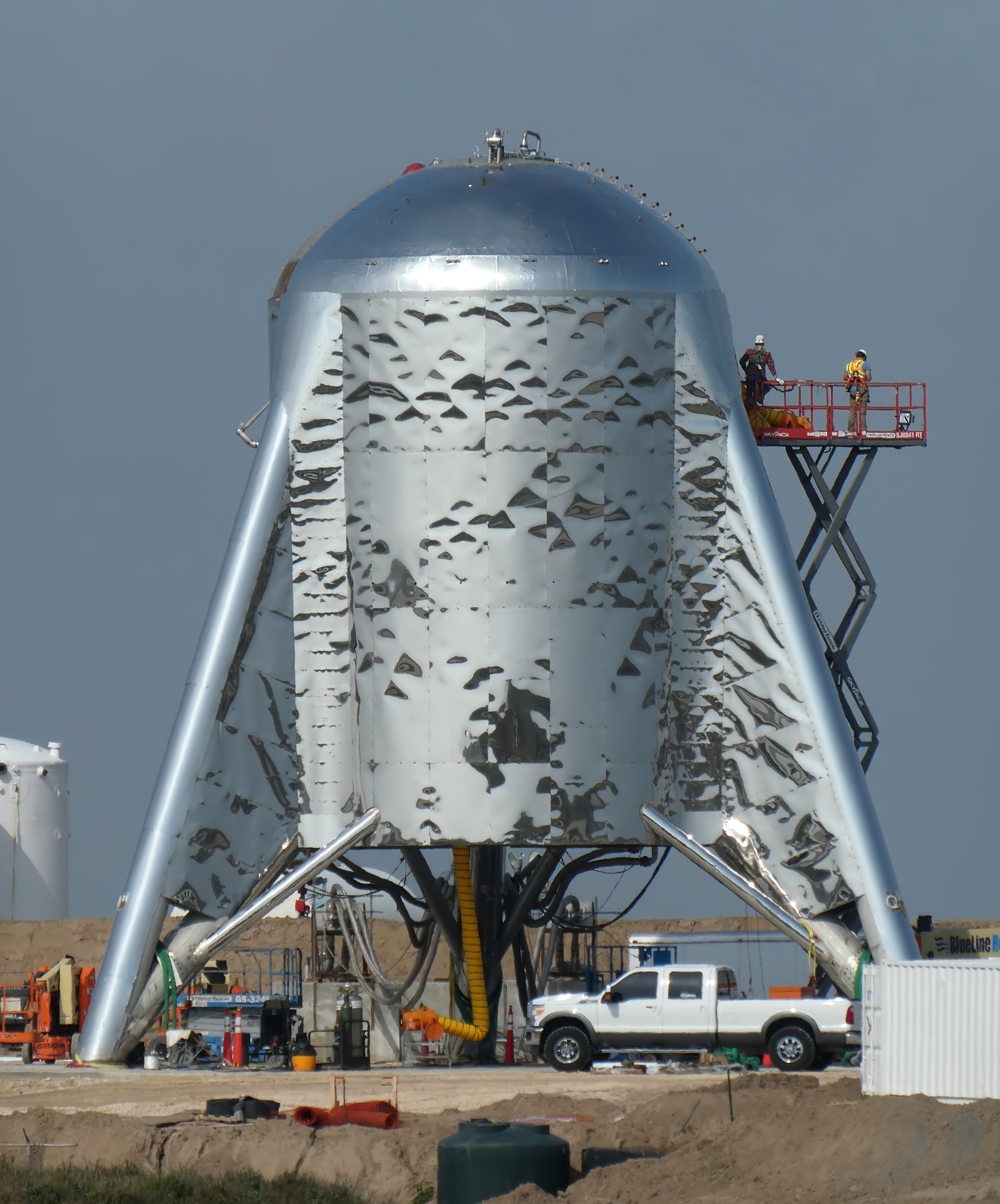
Starhopper

Starbase is SpaceX's fourth active launch facility, and its first private facility. As of 2019, SpaceX leased three U.S. government-owned launch sites: Vandenberg SLC 4 in California, and Cape Canaveral SLC-40 and Kennedy Space Center LC39A both in Florida.

The launch site is in Cameron County, Texas, approximately 17 miles (27 km) east of Brownsville, with launch flyover range over the Gulf of Mexico. The launch site is planned to be optimized for commercial activity, as well as used to fly spacecraft on interplanetary trajectories.

Launches on orbital trajectories from Brownsville will have a constrained flight path, due to the Caribbean Islands as well as the large number of oil platforms in the Gulf of Mexico. SpaceX has stated that they have a good flight path available for the launching of satellites on trajectories toward the commercially valuable geosynchronous orbit.

Although SpaceX initial plans for the Boca Chica launch site were to loft robotic spacecraft to geosynchronous orbits, Elon Musk indicated in September 2014 that "the first person to go to another planet could launch from [the Boca Chica launch site]", but did not indicate which launch vehicle might be used for those launches. In May 2018, Musk clarified that the South Texas launch site would be used exclusively for Starship.

By March 2019, two test articles of Starship were being built, and three by May. The low-altitude, low-velocity Starship test flight rocket was used for initial integrated testing of the Raptor rocket engine with a flight-capable propellant structure, and was slated to also test the newly designed autogenous pressurization system that is replacing traditional helium tank pressurization as well as initial launch and landing algorithms for the much larger 9-metre-diameter (29 ft 6 in) rocket. SpaceX developed their reusable booster technology for the 3-meter-diameter Falcon 9 from 2012 to 2018. The Starhopper prototype was also the platform for the first flight tests of the full-flow staged combustion methalox Raptor engine, where the hopper vehicle was flight tested with a single engine in July/August 2019, but could be fitted with up to three engines to facilitate engine-out tolerance testing.

The launch site has been the main production and testing site of the Starship/Super Heavy system. All Starship vehicles have been constructed here except the Mk2 prototype, which was built in Florida but never completed, and eventually scrapped.

By March 2020, SpaceX had doubled the number of employees onsite for Starship manufacturing, test and operations since January, with over 500 employees working at the site. The employees work in four 12-hour shifts distributed throughout the day, with 4 days on, then 3 off for a given week, followed by 3 days on and 4 off for the next—to enable continuous Starship manufacturing with workers and equipment specialized to each task of serial Starship production. A 1 MW solar farm and a 3.8 MWh battery supplies some of the electricity.

In September 2022, during a first test firing of all six engines of the Starship prototype, scattered hot debris ignited a SpaceX dumpster, and caused a bushfire in the nearby Las Palomas Wildlife Management Area, an environmentally sensitive area, ultimately burning 68 acres before the fire could be doused.

In May 2023, a few weeks after retiring from NASA, ex-head of human spaceflight Kathy Lueders, who later left SpaceX and became an advisor to Vast in 2025, joined SpaceX to oversee operations at Starbase to "give government customers comfort and confidence that Starship is going to be a *real thing* around which they can base future plans and operations."

On June 18, 2025, Ship 36 experienced an energetic failure (explosion) at the Massey's test site at 11:02:52 PM CDT during propellant loading for a static fire. No injuries were reported. The explosion caused fires and damage to the test site and was expected to delay the Starship program, resulting in SpaceX using the Orbital Launch Mount A for static fires of both Ship 37 and Ship 38.

==== Launches ====
On April 20, 2023, Starship flight test 1 was carried out from Starbase, resulting in immense damage to the launch mount. On November 11, 2023, SpaceX announced that they were targeting November 17, 2023 for their next Starship launch date. They conducted the second integrated flight test on the 18th, but it resulted in the explosion of the Super Heavy booster due to oxygen line clogs leading to engine failures, while excessive oxygen venting forced the Starship upper stage to trigger its self-destruct. The launch infrastructure was deemed to be in good shape afterward.

On March 14, 2024, the third flight test launched, ending in the Super Heavy booster crashing into the Gulf of Mexico, and the Starship upper stage disintegrating upon atmospheric re-entry. The launch infrastructure again performed well, and SpaceX had noted their propellant filling processes were faster by about 20 minutes.

On June 6, 2024, the fourth flight test launched, marking the first flight in which both stages reached their end objectives (soft splashdown for booster and ship respectively).

On October 13, 2024, the fifth flight test of Starship featured the first catch of a vehicle. This was followed by an aborted catch during flight 6 due to damage to the launch tower, and a successful catch during both flight 7 and flight 8. Flights 9, 10 and 11 followed from Pad 1 in 2025.

On May 22, 2026, flight 12 became the first launch from Pad 2 and the first flight of the V3 Starship and Super Heavy vehicles and Raptor 3 engines. Flight 13 launched from Pad 2 on July 24, 2026, and deployed the first Starlink V3 satellites. On September 28, 2026, flight 14 became the first Starship flight to reach orbit. It deployed 26 Starlink V3 satellites, then ended early with a splashdown in the Pacific Ocean.

== Facilities ==
=== Launch site (Orbital Launch Pad 1 and 2) ===
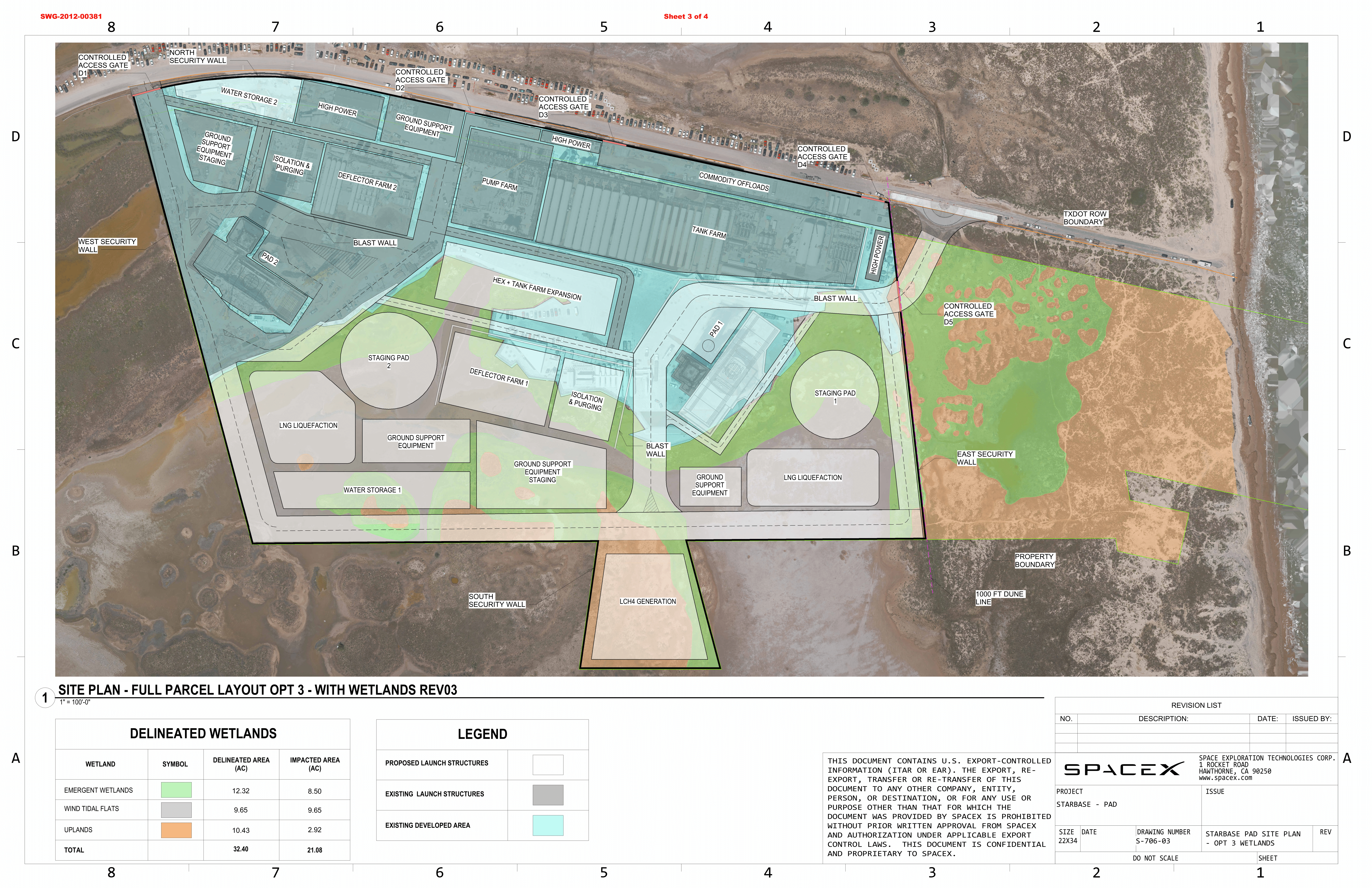
Starbase launch site expansion plan, as of 2025

The launch site is where final testing operations and orbital launching of the Starship spacecraft and Super Heavy boosters occur.

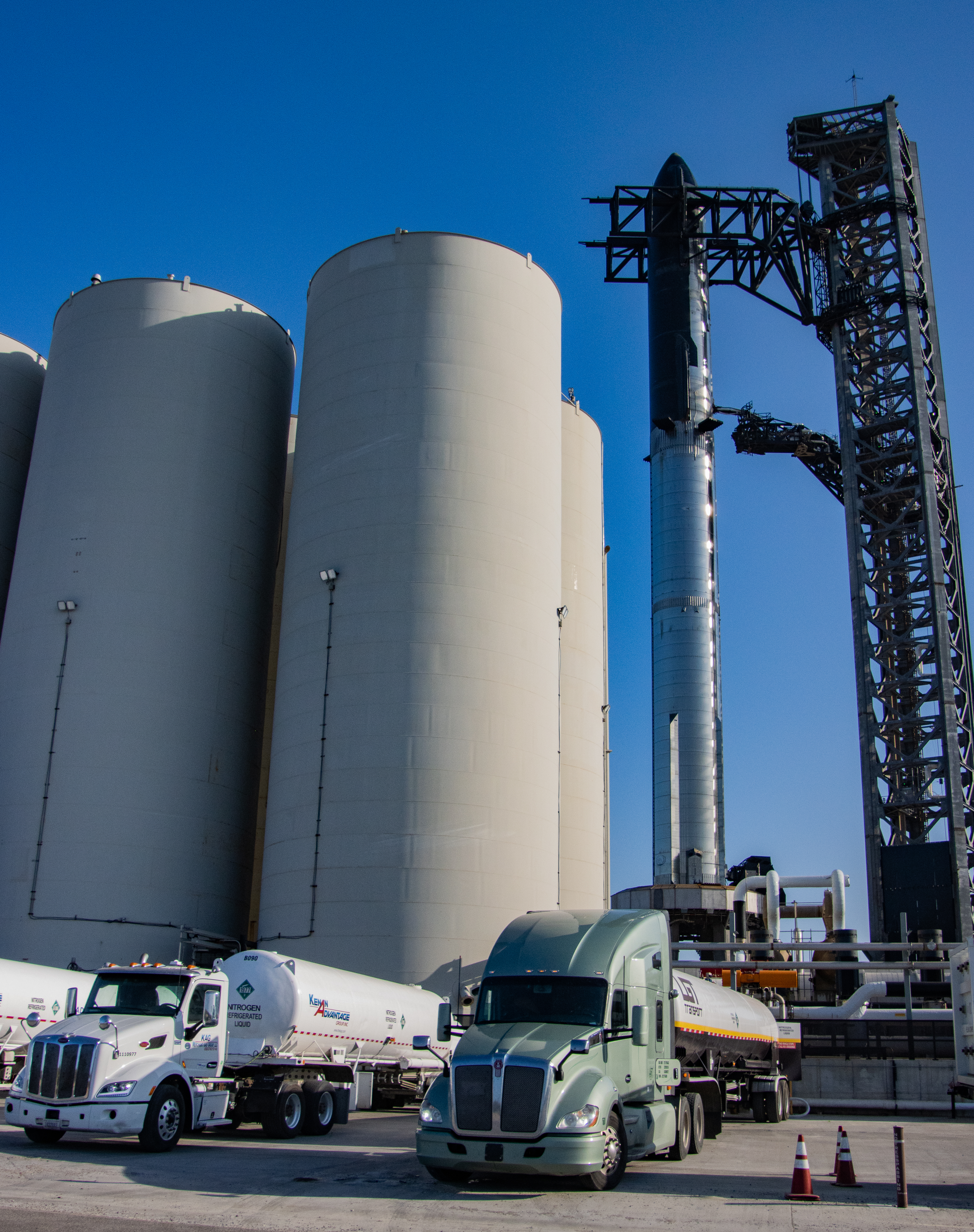
Trucks offloading fuel in the tank farm. The flight test 1 launch vehicle and the integration tower are also visible in the background.

The launch site has two launch pads, Orbital Launch Mount Pad 1 (OLP-1) and 2 (OLP-2), each equipped with an orbital launch mount (OLM), an integration tower (nicknamed "Mechazilla" by SpaceX) and other support structures. As of October 14, 2025, OLP-1 was decommissioned with the intent of being upgraded to accommodate the new V3 Starships and beyond. The upgraded pad will have a flame trench with a diverter and a new launch mount with a water-cooled deck.

The three main areas shown on the map represent (from left to right) the Massey's test site, the production site and the launch site.

==== Orbital Launch Pad construction ====
The OLM is the structure that provides support for the Super Heavy booster when it is on the launch pad. The OLM has twenty clamps to hold the booster in place before liftoff and a quick disconnect providing liquid fuel and electricity. Just below the OLM is a massive steel plate that uses water as a flame deflector. The water is supplied by a nearby water deluge tank farm that uses compressed gas to propel water onto the steel plate under the OLM.

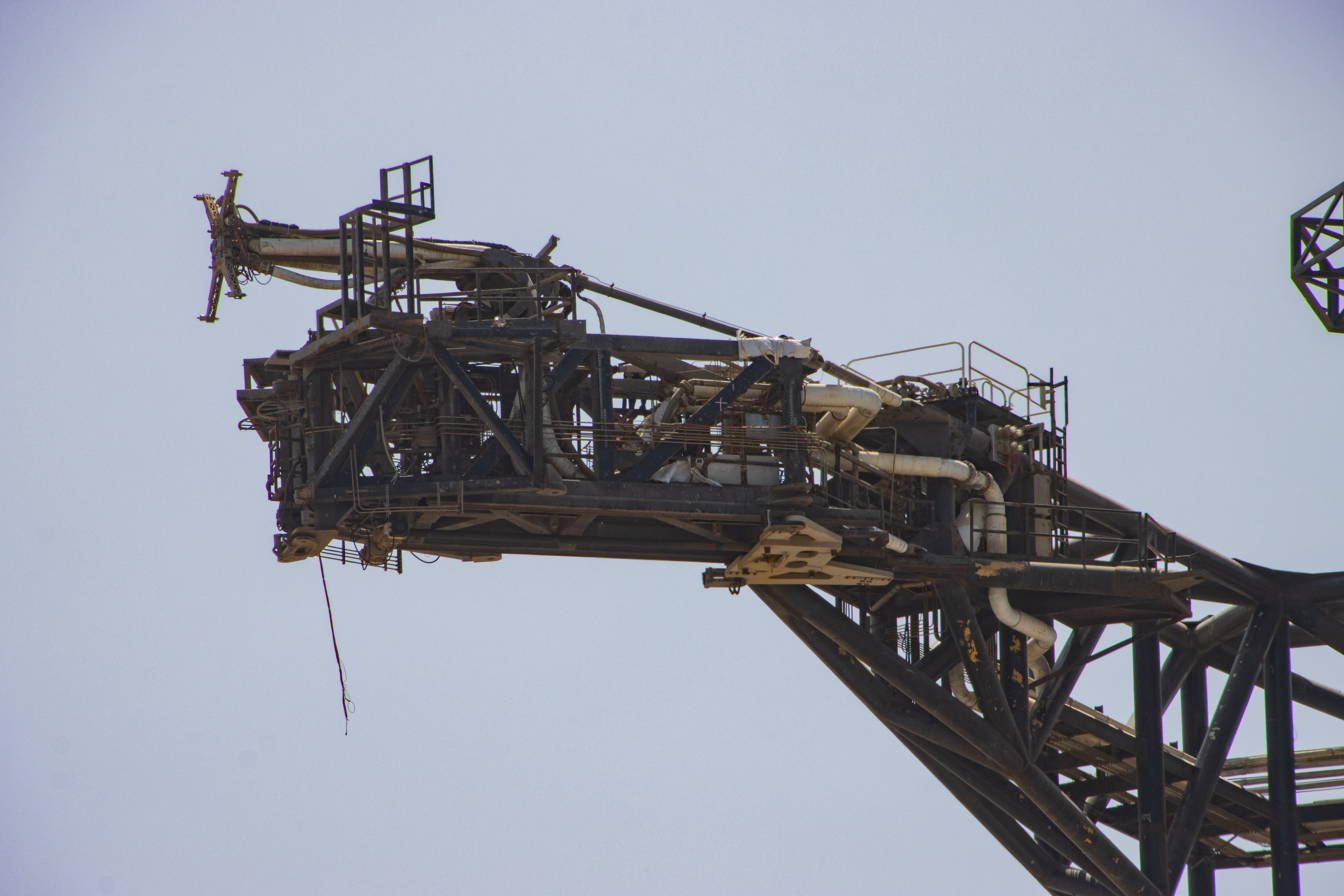
The Ship Quick Disconnect Arm of the launch tower of Pad 1

The integration tower is a type of service structure that serves multiple roles in facilitating the assembly, launch and reuse of Starship launch vehicles. Prior to launch, its "chopstick" arms are used to stack the Super Heavy booster onto the OLM and the Starship upper stage onto the Super Heavy booster. Immediately before launch, the "Ship Quick-Disconnect Arm" tower provides fuel and electrical connections to the Starship upper stage. After launch, the tower's role transitions to recovery operations. Its arms, previously used for assembly, are then used to capture the returning Super Heavy booster, a process initially demonstrated during Starship flight test 5. This design reduces the rocket's mass and mechanical complexity by removing the need for landing legs, as well as enabling more rapid reuse by placing the rocket, upon landing, directly back on the OLP.

The tower is constructed of dark gray steel truss sections and equipped with a lightning rod and small weather station on top. The "chopstick" arms are attached to a carriage and controlled by a pulley at the top of the tower. The pulley is linked to a winch and spool at the base of the tower using a cable. Using the winch and the carriage, the mechanical arms can move vertically, with support from bearings attached at the sides of the carriage. A linear hydraulic actuator moves the arms horizontally. Tracks are mounted on top of the arms, which are used to position the booster or spacecraft.

==== Orbital Launch Pad 2 (OLP-2) ====
Construction of a second launch tower began in May 2024 near the former location of the suborbital launch site. The first tower sections arrived on May 14, 2024. Foundation work for the second tower was spotted on May 25 and concrete pouring began in June. Structure installation began in mid-June with the tower's stacking being completed on August 21. On January 27, 2025, the "chopstick," Launch Tower Arms were lifted and installed onto Integrated Tower 2. These arms have a shorter design, something that SpaceX has tested by catching both B12 and B14 closer to the tower on OLP-1, demonstrating that longer arms are not necessary. It is anticipated that the Launch Tower Arms on OLP-1 will be replaced by the shorter design sometime after OLP-2 is operational. Currently only OLP-2 is capable of a Starship catch due to the launch tower arms having a smaller lip on the landing rails. On February 6, 2025, teams worked to install the reeving cable onto the tower, which aids the installation of the main cable used to move the Chopsticks vertically on the tower.

SpaceX has also been working on Pad 2's OLM, with a significant portion of the main structure complete. Pad 2's OLM also features improvements over that of Pad 1, most notably the inclusion of a water-cooled steel plate on the upper most level to protect the OLM during launch, as well as the addition of a flame diverter system seen previously being used at both the Massey's and McGregor's vertical test stands. This system uses many steel pipes to create a flame bucket that reduces sound levels and protects infrastructure. The launch mount was rolled to the launch site on May 6, 2025, and lifted into place on May 12.

==== Ground Support Equipment (GSE) ====
The launch site includes a tank farm that stores methane, liquid oxygen, water, nitrogen, helium and hydraulic fluid. Subcoolers near the tank farm cool propellant using liquid nitrogen; and various pipes are installed at large facilities. Both launch pads are supplied by this shared tank farm. In Brownsville, SpaceX is also developing an air separation unit to produce liquid oxygen, nitrogen, and argon.

SpaceX is to construct an 8 mi (13 km) pipeline to be known as Starpipe, supplying natural gas from the Port of Brownsville, to be liquefied into methane at Starbase, to Starbase, replacing the hundreds of tanker truck deliveries required for a single Starship launch. The pipeline is planned to be in service by January 2027.

=== Production site ===
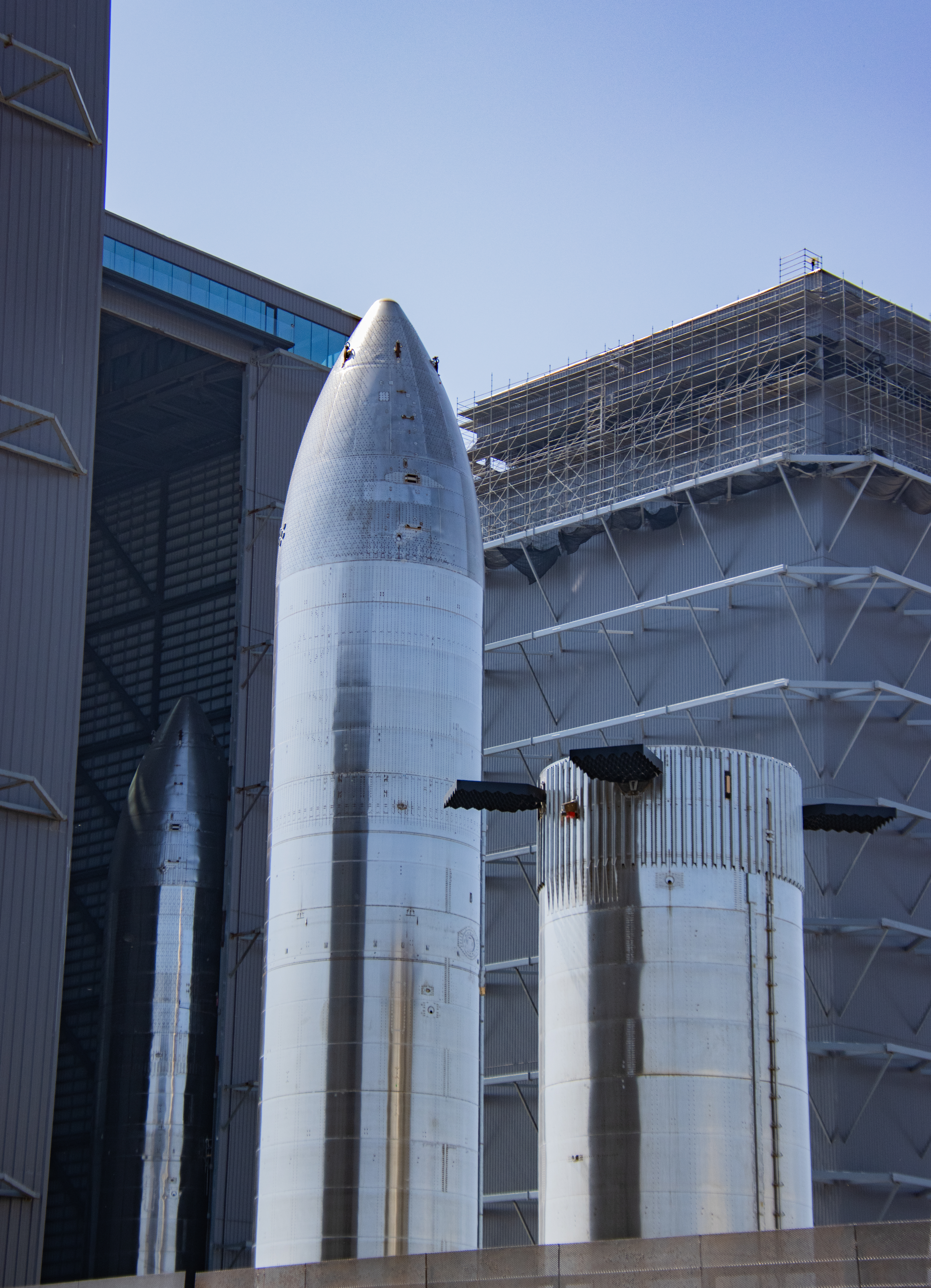
Ships and a booster segment with the High Bay and the Mega Bay visible in the background

The production site, also known as the build site, is where all Starship and Super Heavy prototypes are built and assembled. Peak production at Starfactory is planned to be one Ship per day.

The production site also houses two bays which are responsible for assembling the final vehicles. Mega Bay 2 is where Starship upper stages are stacked and undergo final preparations. Super Heavy boosters, on the other hand, are both built and outfitted with their engines in Mega Bay 1.

The production site was also previously home to the Mid Bay, which was used to stack early Starship test articles. The Mid Bay was demolished in August 2023.

The High Bay was used to stack numerous upper stages, but is no longer used. Demolition of the High Bay began in March 2025 along with the STARGATE building to make room for the upcoming Giga Bay.

The production site also contains a $100 million five story office building and accompanying parking garage as well as a recreation center and restaurant.

==== Sanchez site ====
The Sanchez site, located southwest of the production site, is where construction of many components for infrastructure take place. For example, as of November 2023, it was used to construct stands to be used to move vehicles to allow easier installation of Raptor engines on the Super Heavy boosters. Two of those engine installation stands are now inside the first Mega Bay.

The Sanchez Site is also home to the rocket garden, which is where retired boosters and ships are stored.

The Sanchez site is so named because SpaceX leases it from Sanchez Oil and Gas Corporation, which had previously used it for natural gas extraction.

=== Massey's Test Site ===
The Massey's Test Site is where the majority of SpaceX's design tests take place. It was previously the location of "Massey's Gun Shop and Range" before being sold to SpaceX in 2021. It is the primary location for Ship and Super Heavy cryogenic testing and is frequently used for testing test-tanks and other test articles in order to improve Starship's design. Since May 2024, it has been the sole location for ship static fire tests.

On June 18, 2025, Ship 36 exploded during propellant loading resulting in severe damage to the facility. Other equipment including temporary structures like the work tent, cabins and test stands were also heavily damaged. SpaceX released an update on June 19, clarifying the initial suspected cause to be a composite overwrapped pressure vessel, as well as that no personnel were injured and there was no hazard to local communities. It was expected that Massey's would be non-operational for an unknown period of time. On July 1, 2025, NASASpaceflight estimated that the repairs to the testing site would take at least three to four months. As Massey's is the normal location for ship static fires, as well as ship and booster cryogenic testing, it was at first assumed that subsequent flights would be delayed. However, an adapter was added to Pad 1, allowing Ship 37 to be tested there in July–August, and test 10 occurred in late August.

== Impact ==
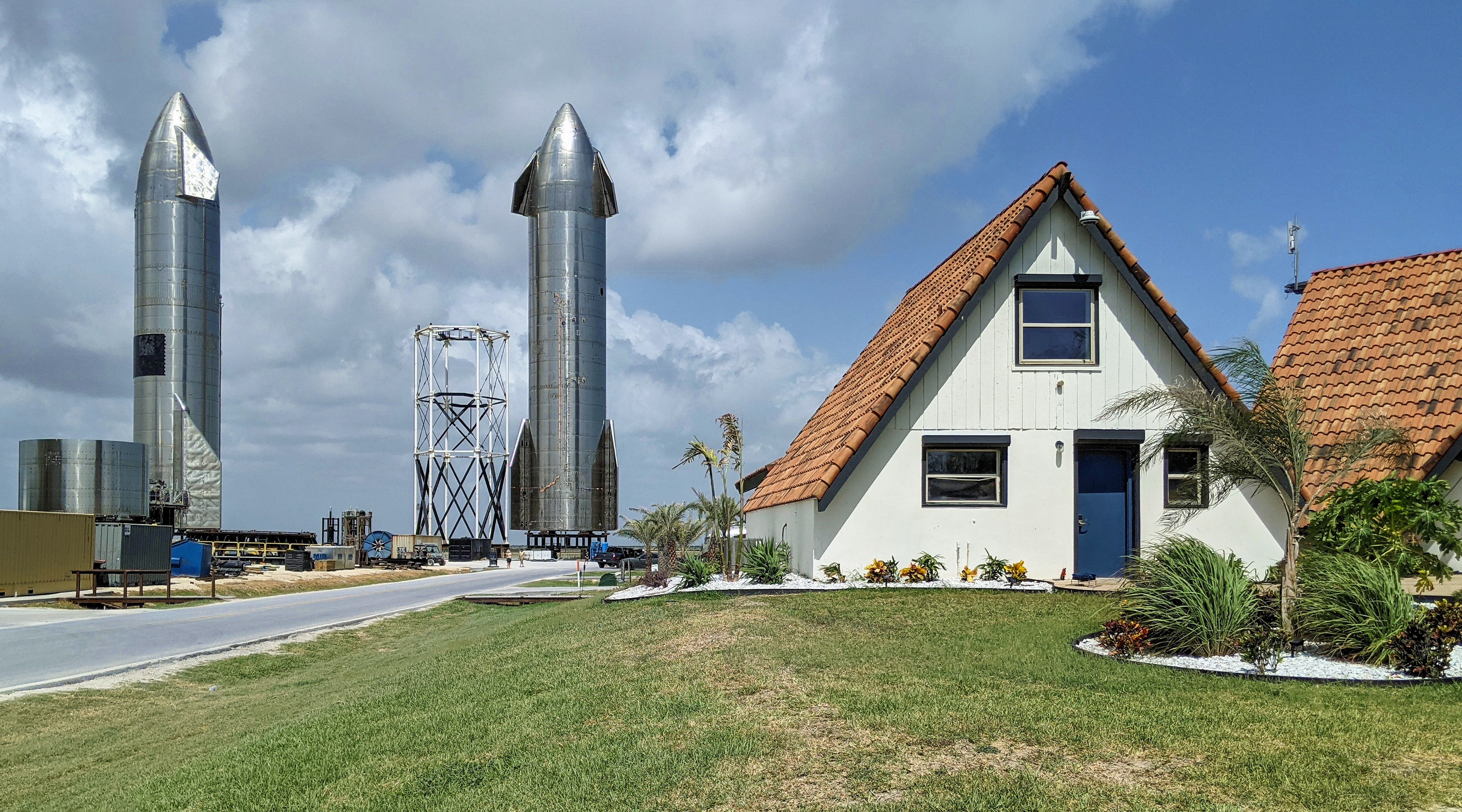
Starship SN15 and SN16 juxtaposed with a local tiki bar

The new launch facility was projected in a 2014 study to generate US$85 million of economic activity in the city of Brownsville and eventually generate approximately US$51 million in annual salaries from some 500 jobs projected to be created by 2024.

A local economic development board was created for South Texas in 2014—the Cameron County Space Port Development Corporation (CCSPDC)—in order to facilitate the development of the aerospace industry in Cameron County near Brownsville. The first project for the newly established board is the SpaceX project to develop a launch site at Boca Chica Beach. In May 2015, Cameron County transferred ownership of 25 lots in Boca Chica to CCSPDC, which could be used in the future to develop event parking.

=== Local and economic impact ===
Among nearby locales, reception to Starship's development has been mixed, especially from cities close to the Starbase spaceport. Proponents of SpaceX's arrival said the company would provide money, education, and job opportunities to the country's poorest areas. Fewer than one-fifth of those 25 or older in the Rio Grande Valley have a bachelor's degree, in comparison to the national average of one-third. The local government has stated that the company boosted the local economy by hiring residents and investing, aiding the three-tenths of the population who live in poverty.

The launch facility was approved for construction two miles from approximately thirty homes, with no indication that this would cause problems for the homeowners. Five years later in 2019, following an FAA re-evaluation of the environmental impact and the issuance of new FAA requirements that residents be asked to voluntarily stay outside their houses during particular tanking and engine ignition tests, SpaceX decided that a couple dozen of these homes were too close to the launch facility over the long term and sought acquisition of these properties. An attorney with expertise on such situations referred to the timeframe given by SpaceX for homeowners to consider their purchase (two weeks) offer as "aggressive".

In 2021, activist Elias Cantu of the League of United Latin American Citizens said that the company encourages Brownsville's gentrification, and that he fears an ever-increasing property valuation and a risk of low-income residents being pushed out of the neighborhood.

In June 2021, Cameron County District Attorney Luis Saenz threatened to prosecute SpaceX for unauthorized road and beach closures, as well as employing security officers who may not be licensed to carry handguns. The United States Fish and Wildlife Service said that SpaceX had caused 1,000 hours of highway closures in 2019, well above the permitted 300 hours, prompting concerns of economic impacts from the extra 700 hours of road closures.

During the SN8 launch, SpaceX ignored the FAA's models indicating that weather conditions could strengthen the shockwave created by rocket explosion and cause damage to nearby homes. SN8 lifted off despite multiple warnings that this would violate the company's launch license. Following the launch, the FAA's Associate Administrator Wayne Monteith commented that SpaceX showed poor process discipline by relying on assumptions, as such call into question the company's safety culture. Members of the United States Congress voiced concerns about the FAA's response. However, the FAA administrator stated that while SpaceX has made several corrections for those violations, the FAA would not approve further flights if SpaceX did not continue to perform those corrections.

A report from The Wall Street Journal in November 2023 found that homeowners, as well as locals in the area, were conflicted with the appearance of Starbase in the vicinity. Some locals stated that they wanted SpaceX to "move on from Cameron County", whereas some locals instead offered a positive view and referred to SpaceX's impact on their economy.

The economic impacts of the spaceport have included an influx of jobs into the area, mostly high-skill, high-wage careers. In addition, The Wall Street Journal found that Musk had plans in place to start a town near SpaceX and Boring Company facilities, dubbed "Snailbrook", wherein its employees would live and work. These plans were met with significant backlash and controversy. Additionally, local housing activists had cited concerns about gentrification displacing locals back in May 2022, with these concerns only resurfacing in light of recent events. The local government has stated that the company boosted the local economy by hiring residents and investing, aiding the three-tenths of the population who live in poverty.

Senator Tammy Duckworth expressed concerns about who will regulate the spaceport, as NASA is not a regulatory agency, and the FAA has limited experience with space travel. The FAA oversaw SpaceX's investigation of the April 20, 2023 launch and explosion, and had granted one license for that launch only. Whether the space industry will implement plans for Brownsville to become a research center remains unknown.

=== Political ties ===
Dozens of public officials representing the area around Starbase have financial and business ties with the growth of the complex. The growth has been charged by extensive lobbying in local government and with campaign contributions. The company also received US$15 million in subsidies plus a ten-year tax exemption from the county, awarded in 2014, enabling the growth. Two dozen officials have received US$500,000 collectively since then in campaign contributions.

=== Research facilities ===
The Brownsville Economic Development Council (BEDC) was building a space tracking facility in Boca Chica Village on a 2.3-acre (9,300 m^{2}) site adjacent to the SpaceX launch control center. The STARGATE tracking facility is a joint project of the BEDC, SpaceX, and the University of Texas Rio Grande Valley (formerly the University of Texas at Brownsville at the time the agreement was reached).

=== Tourism, livestreaming coverage ===
In January 2016, the South Padre Island Convention and Visitors Advisory Board (CVA) recommended that the South Padre Island City Council "proceed with further planning regarding potential SpaceX viewing sites". The spaceport causes beach closures at Boca Chica beach during rocket launches. The closest viewing spots are Rocket Ranch; Isla Blanca Park on South Padre Island; and Port Isabel. Everyday Astronaut warned against crossing the Mexican border because of the dangers of Matamoros, Tamaulipas.

Launches from Starbase in South Texas have attracted SpaceX fans, gathering and taking photos. YouTube channels with large followings such as LabPadre and NASASpaceflight have been covering Starship's development since 2019, setting up cameras around the launch and production complex and broadcasting 24-hour livestreams.

=== Airspace closures and air traffic ===
Starship vehicles launched from Starbase fly east across the Gulf of Mexico and the Straits of Florida on a suborbital trajectory that ends with the upper stage splashing down in the Indian Ocean, a landing area for which the FAA issued a tiered environmental assessment and finding of no significant impact in March 2024. For each launch the agency establishes aircraft hazard areas—volumes of airspace used to segregate air traffic from the vehicle, its jettisoned stages and any debris—which uninvolved aircraft are prohibited from entering and which are sized so that the probability of an aircraft being struck by hazardous debris does not exceed one in a million. The areas are defined by a series of points with associated dates, times and durations, and are passed to airspace users as danger areas by NOTAM. Where a launch affects airspace managed by other countries, the FAA leads the coordination of the international NOTAMs and prepares a request for each affected flight information region, allowing about ten days for planning and three days for publication; because launch dates slip, each request carries a primary window and up to six backup windows. In the record of decision accompanying its February 2026 approval of additional launch trajectories from the site, the FAA estimated that "the average expected flight delay for launches would last approximately 40 minutes and could last up to two hours".

Two Starship failures in 2025 disrupted air traffic downrange of the launch site. After the seventh flight test broke up over the Caribbean on January 16, 2025, the FAA activated debris response areas and briefly slowed or diverted aircraft near Puerto Rico, and debris reached the Turks and Caicos Islands. After the eighth flight test failed in a similar way on March 6, 2025, the Miami, Fort Lauderdale, Palm Beach and Orlando airports halted flights for 80 minutes. A ProPublica investigation published in January 2026 reported that at least eleven aircraft were inside closed airspace when the seventh flight test broke up, and that an Iberia flight carrying 283 passengers declared a fuel emergency while being kept clear of a debris area. In January 2026 the FAA issued a safety alert for operators on airspace management for space launch activities, which advised flight crews to allow for additional holding fuel and noted that debris response areas are not issued in oceanic or non-radar airspace; the FAA says those procedures are generally not applied in non-U.S. airspace.

Controlled re-entries of spent orbital stages are aimed at uninhabited ocean, which puts most of them in the southern parts of the Pacific, Indian and Atlantic oceans. Starbase operations have been linked to disruption on air routes across the Indian Ocean as well. In January 2025, Qantas said that it had delayed several services on its Sydney–Johannesburg route, some by between one and six hours, after advice from the United States government about the reentry of SpaceX rockets over what the airline described as "an extensive area of the Southern Indian Ocean". Ben Holland, the head of Qantas's Operations Centre, said that "the timing of recent launches have moved around at late notice which has meant we've had to delay some flights just prior to departure", and that Qantas was in contact with SpaceX "to see if they can refine the areas and time windows for the rocket re-entries". The Guardian reported that the advisories specified coordinates and times that could change until shortly before departure, and that South African Airways services were also affected. An analysis of flight-tracking data by the Australian Computer Society publication Information Age found that southbound services from Sydney were delayed by about an hour on average, while return services from Johannesburg were delayed by as much as six hours.

Reporting differed on how much of that disruption originated at Starbase. The Australian Broadcasting Corporation attributed part of it to the seventh flight test, which was postponed several times before launching on January 16, 2025, and described the reentry area as lying in the Sydney–Johannesburg flight path. Other coverage attributed most of the warnings to the controlled deorbiting of Falcon 9 upper stages after Starlink missions rather than to Starship. A 2023 working paper presented by the United States to ICAO's Africa-Indian Ocean regional group used one such re-entry—a Starlink upper stage southeast of Mauritius—as its worked example of the coordination process, with the hazard area divided between the Johannesburg, Mauritius and Melbourne flight information regions and a primary re-entry day followed by six backup days. Aviation law specialist Ron Bartsch said that the risk to aircraft was "extremely remote" and that the flights could have been rerouted instead of delayed.

== Environmental reception ==
Starbase's operations on at least 19 occasions between 2019 and mid-2024, caused "fires, leaks, explosions or other problems". Some residents of Boca Chica Village, Brownsville, and environmental activists criticized the Starship development program, stating that SpaceX had harmed local wildlife, conducted unauthorized test flights along with infrastructure construction, and polluted the area with noise.

Starbase had originally planned to launch Falcon rockets when the original environmental assessment was completed in 2014. The site in 2019 was subsequently used to develop Starship and therefore required a revised environmental assessment. The spaceport was approved under the assumption that the Falcon Heavy rocket would launch there, thus creating a large radius where Starship debris can land on, without regulatory compliance.

=== Animal conservation ===
Environmental groups warned that the program threatens wildlife in the area, including 18 vulnerable and endangered species. The Center for Biological Diversity (CBD) said that Starbase is "surrounded by state parks and national wildlife refuge lands" and include "important habitats for imperiled wildlife" including the critically endangered Kemp's ridley sea-turtle, raising concerns about the impact of Starbase's activities to these habitats and endangered species within.

SpaceX said they had a partnership with Sea Turtle, Incorporated—a South Texas nonprofit dedicated to sea turtle conservation—to assist with finding and transporting injured sea turtles to their facilities for treatment. SpaceX adopted Boca Chica Beach and is responsible for quarterly cleaning the beach and State Highway 4.

The development of Starship has resulted in several lawsuits against the FAA and SpaceX from environmental groups including the CBD; as of December 2023, these lawsuits were ongoing. Biologists have raised concerns over the impact of Starbase's noise and light pollution on migratory bird species that use the nearby tidal flats.

SpaceX disclosed that biologists had conducted independent biological monitoring for birds near Starbase for 10 years, in a protocol developed by the United States Fish and Wildlife Service (USFWS), and that the monitoring had not shown any impact to bird populations. The company mentioned that flight 5 would see infrared drone surveillance pre- and post-launch to track bird nesting presence. SpaceX also said they worked with USFWS experts prior to launches.

Stephanie Bilodeau, a conservation bird biologist, said that piping plovers and red knots, both threatened species of birds, have "all but disappeared" from the flats after SpaceX began construction of Starbase in 2021. Additionally, in 2021, a USFWS employee complained of "unauthorized encroachments and trespass on the refuge" by SpaceX employees.

=== 2019–2023 ===
In 2021, some of the early suborbital hop tests ended in large explosions, causing disruption to residents and wildlife reserves. Some residents in the village of Boca Chica had to leave the area prior to each launch due to their proximity. The FAA allowed the public to comment until November 1, 2021, on the environmental impact statement draft that they released on September 19, 2021. SpaceX's environmental assessment missed important details about the propellant source. One such example is SpaceX's plan of building a 250-megawatt gas-fired power plant without specifying how it would obtain tens of millions of cubic feet of gas per day. Pat Parenteau, a law professor and senior counsel for the Environmental Advocacy Clinic at Vermont Law School, stated that it was unusual to exclude such details, which could violate the US National Environmental Policy Act, in addition to the Clean Air Act. David Newstead, the director of one local environmental group, said that the explosion of SN11 left rocket debris on parts of the wildlife refuge that took three months to clean up. In September 2022 a static-fire test of a Raptor engine by SpaceX caused a 68-acre fire on the protected wildlife reserve, killing wildlife and eventually being contained by firefighters. The blaze occurred in the Las Palomas Wildlife Management Area in the Rio Grande Valley, home to several protected species.

Before the first Integrated Flight Test on April 20, 2023, 27 organizations including the Sierra Club, South Texas Environmental Justice Network, Another Gulf is Possible, Voces Unidas, Trucha, and the Carrizo/Comecrudo Tribe signed a letter expressing their concerns and opposition to it. They cited gentrification and overpolicing of the area, and disruptions to local access to fishing and native ceremonies, along with high risk of explosive and methane-emitting accidents, among others. Even before then, parts of the wildlife refuge were covered with rocket debris after early failed test launches in 2021.

=== Starship flight test 1 ===
After the launch, which was plagued by engine fire control issues and forced to end in an explosion via self-destruct over the Gulf, a representative of Another Gulf also criticized the launch's noise levels, blasting of particulate matter (later determined to be sand) on Port Isabel residents 10 km (6.5 miles) away, and the Federal Energy Regulatory Commission's approval that same day of new liquefied natural gas terminals within close proximity of Port Isabel. The launch scattered debris across 385 acres (156 ha) of SpaceX property and Boca Chica State Park, though no debris was found on refuge fee-owned lands. It also started a wildfire that burned 3.5 acres (1.4 ha) of state park land to the south of the pad. A USFWS survey found no evidence of dead birds or other wildlife following the launch, though Texas Public Radio reported that a quail's nest was charred.

After the failed first test launch of the Starship stack, residents of the nearby Port Isabel complained of a "dust" covering homes, cars, and streets. This dust reportedly consisted of fine particles of sand and soil that had been kicked up into the atmosphere from the launch of Starship, with concerns by environmental groups over further damage to the habitat caused by cleanup efforts. According to Dave Cortez of the Sierra Club environmental advocacy group, several residents complained of broken windows in their businesses and the sand/soil particles covering their homes. CNBC reported that representatives from the Club and the CBD said the blast's particulate ejecta (sand) could have negative effects on Port Isabel residents and endangered species' health, and that the blast prevented wildlife biologists from inspecting the area until April 22, 2023.

On May 1, ten days after the launch, the Tribe and four environmental groups including the CBD sued the FAA for allegedly granting the launch license, in the plaintiffs' view, "too early". SpaceX would later join the FAA as a co-defendant in order to "fight off" the environmental groups' lawsuit over Starship. SpaceX stated the suit could potentially "significantly delay" its Starship program, which in turn would cause "severe injury" to SpaceX's business, the US government, and private customers. The suit alleges that the FAA allowed SpaceX to bypass environmental reviews due to Musk's financial and political influence. In September 2025, federal judge Carl J. Nichols dismissed the case, saying the FAA was not negligent.

=== Starship flight test 2 ===
Spectators of both flight test 1 and November flight test 2 launches have reportedly caused damage to local habitats in the nearby wildlife reserve, prompting further criticism by environmental groups. After reports of damage to tidal flats south of the launchpad following flight test 2 in November 2023, the USFWS said that they are working with SpaceX "to educate the public on the importance of tidal flat habitat".

Texas US Senator Ted Cruz has said that the second Starship launch was "after months of delay stemming from bureaucratic red tape from AST, Fish and Wildlife and other agencies injecting themselves into the process” resulting in "asinine delays". FAA associate administrator Kelvin Coleman said that the environmental reviews Senator Cruz referred to were required in order to "ensure compliance with NEPA and related environmental laws" and were being conducted in accordance with US law. Environmental protection groups on the other hand have accused regulatory agencies of not doing enough to protect the environment and wildlife in the area surrounding the launch site.

On February 2, 2024, an appellate ruling was made, reversing a lower court decision allowing beach closures.

=== Deluge system ===
SpaceX later built a water deluge system underneath the launch pad from July 5 to 17, 2023, testing it at full pressure for the first time on July 28. However, SpaceX ignored procedures required by state and federal laws, including specifying the water mix's composition, where it drains into, and how much of it is used, to apply for permits to test the system. On October 19, the USFWS surveyed the area around the Boca Chica launch facility, as well as on October 25, 2023, when the water deluge system was taken into account.

Following 14 complaints to the Texas Commission on Environmental Quality (TCEQ) alleging environmental impact from the Starship deluge system, a TCEQ notice said SpaceX violated environmental regulations such as the Clean Water Act by repeatedly releasing pollutants into or near bodies of water. SpaceX was fined around $148,000 by the Environmental Protection Agency (EPA) for discharging industrial water with their deluge system without the required permit.

In their statement, SpaceX said that the deflector did not spray pollutants into the environment and used drinking water, and said that samples of outflow water consistently showed negligible traces of contaminants and within standards. In their TCEQ permit application summary, SpaceX stated that discharges are expected to contain total dissolved solids constituents nitrate, phosphorus, sulfate, chloride, fluoride, aluminum, cadmium, chromium, copper, cyanide, and zinc. According to the EPA, SpaceX discharged between 34,200 and 45,300 gallons of fresh water on seven different occasions directly into the wetlands surrounding the launch site.

In response, SpaceX released a statement criticizing the approval process, saying that the FAA was distracted by unimportant issues instead of focusing on critical safety analysis for the public and the environment. SpaceX has since applied for a discharge permit; TCEQ said the approval process could take at least 330 days.

In a meeting of the United States House Science Subcommittee on Space and Aeronautics on 10 September 2024, Brian Babin, Haley Stevens, and members of the space industry criticized the FAA's Part 450 commercial launch and reentry regulations that they claim threaten American competitiveness in space. Dave Cavossa, president of the Commercial Spaceflight Federation, said the implementation of regulations "has caused severe licensing delays, confusion and is jeopardizing our long-held leadership position."

=== Trespassing ===
Cards Against Humanity (CAH) accused SpaceX of trespassing on land they bought in 2017 to slow down Donald Trump's Mexico border wall. The company cleared land belonging to CAH and used it to store construction materials. A real estate analyst for the company called a CAH executive soon after it was discovered, offering to purchase the land from them. In September 2024, CAH sued in Cameron County District Court for trespassing and destruction of property, seeking US$15 million. The case was settled in October 2025, with SpaceX removing their equipment under undisclosed terms and CAH planning to return the property to its natural state.

=== 2022 reassessment ===
A reassessment of the previous environmental review was required after 2022 when SpaceX desired to increase the frequency of launches and increase the size and power of the Starship Super Heavy booster and Starship upper stage from the specification of the v1 booster and ship used in the previous review. In November 2024, the FAA released the draft version of the revised Environmental Assessment and indicated that it would grant SpaceX regulatory permission to increase annual launches from five to 25, and to increase the power and size of the vehicles launched there. The FAA stated that "all pertinent conditions and requirements of the prior approval have been met" and that there "were no significant environmental changes because all pertinent conditions and requirement of the 2022 PEA have been met or will be met in the current action." A public comment period opened on November 20, 2024, and closed on January 17, 2025, and the FAA held five public meetings to solicit feedback.

== See also ==
- List of spaceports
- SpaceX reusable launch system development program
- Starship HLS, lunar variant of the Starship spacecraft developed at the South Texas site
- SpaceX Starbase, Louisiana, planned launch site in Louisiana
- Shifting Baselines, a 2025 documentary film about the project and its environmental and social impact on the Boca Chica region
