= Starship flight test 8 =

Eighth launch of SpaceX Starship

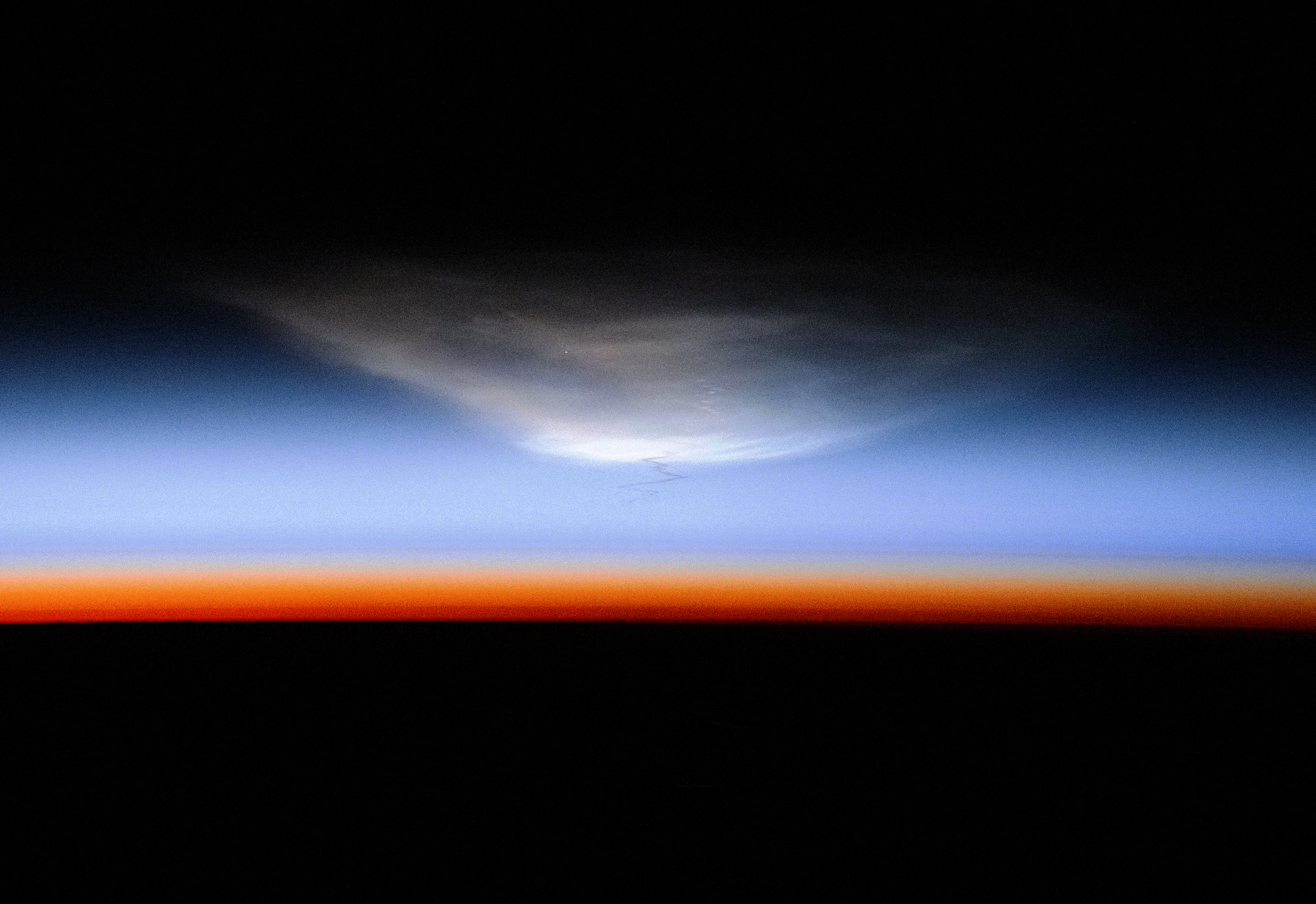
- Ship 34 after breaking up in the upper atmosphere as seen from the International Space Station
- Mission type: Flight test
- Operator: SpaceX

Spacecraft properties
- Spacecraft: Starship Ship 34
- Spacecraft type: Starship (Block 2)
- Manufacturer: SpaceX
- Payload mass: ~8,000 kg (18,000 lb)

Start of mission
- Launch date: March 6, 2025, 5:30:31 pm CST (23:30:31 UTC)
- Rocket: Super Heavy (Block 2, B15-1)
- Launch site: Starbase, OLP-1
- Deployed from: Boca Chica, Texas

End of mission
- Disposal: Ship: Flight termination system activated after engine explosion due to hardware failure and fire
- Destroyed: Ship: March 6, 2025, 5:40:06 pm CST (23:40:06 UTC)
- Landing date: Super Heavy: March 6, 2025, 5:37:33 pm CST (23:37:33 UTC)
- Landing site: Super Heavy: Starbase, OLP-1

Orbital parameters
- Regime: Suborbital
- Perigee altitude: −3,600 km (−2,200 mi)
- Apogee altitude: 146 km (91 mi)
- Inclination: 26.4°

Payload
- 4 Starlink mass simulators
- Mass: ~8,000 kg (18,000 lb)
- Mission patch SpaceX Starship flight tests

Starship flight test 8 was the eighth flight test of a SpaceX Starship launch vehicle. The launch tower successfully caught Booster 15; Ship 34 was destroyed before completing its planned flight, as during its initial burn four of the six engines experienced premature shutdowns that resulted in a loss of attitude control followed by a total loss of telemetry. The vehicle's breakup was observed from the Bahamas, Florida, Jamaica and the Turks and Caicos Islands. It was the second flight and second failure of a Block 2 ship.

SpaceX had previously aborted a launch attempt late into the count on March 3, 2025, with a second attempt lifting off on March 6, 2025, at 5:30:31 pm CST (23:30:31 UTC).

== Background ==
=== Vehicle testing ahead of launch ===
Booster 15 (B15) underwent cryogenic testing on December 29, 2024. Ship 34 (S34) was moved to Massey's test site on January 15, 2025, just before Flight 7, where it conducted cryogenic tests on January 17 and 18, 2025.

On February 8, 2025, B15 rolled to Orbital Launch Pad 1 for static fire testing, and the test was conducted the following day. On February 10, SpaceX rolled S34 to the Massey's test site for static fire testing. It conducted a long duration static fire (60 seconds) on February 11. B15 was rolled to OLP-1 on February 25, and S34 was rolled to OLP-1 on March 2. They were stacked later that evening.

=== Impact of flight test 7 ===
During Starship flight test 7 on January 16, 2025, initial data indicated that a fire broke out mid-flight, leading to the destruction of the vehicle. SpaceX suspects the fire was caused by an issue with the propellant system, that led to excess pressure in the cavity above the engine firewall.

The US Federal Aviation Administration (FAA) ordered SpaceX to perform a mishap investigation into the breakup, grounding Starship until the inquiry was complete. Elon Musk described the event as "barely a bump in the road," indicating that the issues would be resolved quickly. Musk suggested that a subsequent launch could occur the following month, depending on testing progress.

On February 24, 2025, SpaceX announced that they had completed their mishap investigation into Flight 7. Subsequently, on February 26, 2025, the FAA approved the launch license with modifications based on the results of the mishap investigation.

== Mission profile ==
Attempt	Planned	Result	Turnaround	Reason	Decision point	Weather go (%)	Notes
1	3 Mar 2025, 5:45:00 pm	Scrubbed	—	Technical	3 Mar 2025, 5:54 pm (T−00:00:40 hold)	65%	Multiple undisclosed problems with first and second stages.
2	6 Mar 2025, 5:30:24 pm	Failure	2 days 23 hours 45 minutes	Technical	6 Mar 2025, 5:39 pm (T+00:09:35)		Hardware Failure in a second stage engine resulting in loss of control and breakup of the vehicle.

The mission profile for flight test 8 was similar to the previous launch's plan, targeting a splashdown in the Indian Ocean and a catch of the booster. The ship was scheduled to deploy four intentionally destructible Starlink "simulators" which were also expected to reenter over the Indian Ocean.

=== Flight timeline ===
Time	Event	March 3, 2025	March 6, 2025
−01:15:00	Flight director conducts a poll and verifies go for propellant loading	Go for propellant loading	Go for propellant loading
−00:45:59	Starship oxidizer (liquid oxygen) load start	Success	Success
−00:42:59	Starship fuel (liquid methane) load start	Success	Success
−00:41:22	Super Heavy fuel (liquid methane) load start	Success	Success
−00:35:35	Super Heavy oxidizer (liquid oxygen) load start	Success	Success
−00:19:40	Super Heavy and Starship engine chill	Success	Success
−00:03:20	Starship propellant load complete	Success	Success
−00:02:50	Super Heavy propellant load complete	Success	Success
−00:00:30	Flight director verifies go for launch	No go Launch scrubbed at T−00:00:40	Go for launch
−00:00:10	Flame deflector activation	—N/a	Success
−00:00:03	Super Heavy engine ignition	—N/a	Success
+00:00:02	Liftoff	—N/a	Success
+00:01:02	Throttle down for max q during ascent (moment of peak mechanical stress on the rocket)	—N/a	Success
+00:02:32	Super Heavy most engines cutoff (MECO)	—N/a	Success
+00:02:40	Starship engine ignition and stage separation (hot-staging)	—N/a	Success
+00:02:45	Super Heavy boostback burn start	—N/a	Partial failure 8 out of 10 engines reignited
+00:04:06	Super Heavy boostback burn shutdown	—N/a	Success
+00:04:08	Hot-stage jettison	—N/a	Success
+00:06:34	Super Heavy landing burn start	—N/a	Partial failure 12 out of 13 engines ignited
+00:07:02	Super Heavy landing burn shutdown and catch	—N/a	Success
+00:08:44	Starship engine cutoff (SECO)	—N/a	Failure; Engines began to fail at T+08:04 and vehicle spun out of control, Ship Destroyed at T+09:35
+00:17:24	Starlink simulator satellites deploy demo	—N/a	—N/a
+00:37:28	Raptor in-space relight demo	—N/a	—N/a
+00:47:22	Starship atmospheric reentry	—N/a	—N/a
+01:03:05	Starship is transonic	—N/a	—N/a
+01:04:20	Starship is subsonic	—N/a	—N/a
+01:06:04	Starship landing flip	—N/a	—N/a
+01:06:06	Starship landing burn	—N/a	—N/a
+01:06:26	Starship splashdown	—N/a	—N/a
Source: SpaceX

=== March 3, 2025, attempt ===
On March 3, 2025, Starship and Super Heavy began propellant loading, with SpaceX targeting a launch at 23:45 UTC (5:45 pm CST). However, after propellant loading, undisclosed issues arose with both vehicles and the count was held at T−40 seconds. SpaceX was able to resolve the issue and resume the countdown, flight computers detected additional problems, automatically resetting the count to T−40 seconds. After additional attempts at troubleshooting, flight controllers scrubbed (discontinued) the launch attempt.

=== Launch ===
After the scrub of the launch attempt on March 3, Starship and Super Heavy launched from Starbase on March 6, with the booster completing its ascent burn nominally. Starship continued to ascend after stage separation from the booster, with the Super Heavy completing its boostback burn with two engines less than planned. Despite this, SpaceX gave the go ahead for booster catch, and the booster was successfully caught by the chopstick arms on the launch pad after a landing burn with 12 out of 13 center engines. The double Raptor engine relighting failure was linked to engine ignition issues caused by unfavorable thermal conditions.

Starship continued its ascent burn, but 4 engines (1 RVac, 3 sea level Raptors) started to shut down at T+8:04, roughly 30 seconds before the planned SECO. Starship lost attitude control, and SpaceX mission control confirmed during the flight that they lost contact with the ship. The ship was observed breaking up and reentering the atmosphere over Florida and the Bahamas several minutes after contact was lost. The most likely cause of the mishap was the failure of a Raptor sea level engine part, which caused propellant to mix and ignite, leading to a fire in the engine bay. This failure was distinct from the one that prematurely ended Flight 7. Following this anomaly, the Autonomous Flight Safety System on board the Ship was thought to have taken measures in order to ensure that none of its remains left the predetermined safety corridor.

=== Aftermath ===
Similar to what happened after Flight 7, the US Federal Aviation Administration (FAA) again ordered SpaceX to perform a mishap investigation into the breakup. On June 12, the FAA announced that the mishap investigation into Flight 8 was closed. The report highlighted 8 corrective actions to prevent reoccurrence of the issues, and the FAA verified that these corrective actions were implemented prior to Flight 9.
