= Ila Loetscher =

American aviator and conservationist

- Loetscher holding a sea turtle
- Born: October 30, 1904; Callender, Iowa, US
- Died: January 4, 2000 (aged 95); Brownsville, Texas, US
- Occupations: Aviator, conservationist
- Known for: "The Turtle Lady"

Ila Fox Loetscher (30 October 1904 – January 4, 2000), also known as the "Turtle Lady", was an American female aviation pioneer and noted advocate for the care and preservation of sea turtles.

== Early life and aviation ==
Ila Marie Fox was born on 30 October 1904 in Callender, Iowa. Her father was a country doctor. She received her early education in Pella, Iowa, before ultimately graduating from the University of Iowa.

From her early life, Loetscher had developed in interested in engines and aviation, and she became, at the age of 25, the first licensed native Iowa female pilot. At the invitation of her friend Amelia Earhart, Loetscher was one of the 99 charter members of the Ninety-Nines, an organization founded in 1929 to promote fellowship and support for female pilots.

By the 1950s, her focus had changed from flying to family. However, when David Loetscher, her husband of 32 years, died in 1955, Loetscher opted for a new beginning and moved to South Padre Island, Texas.

== Her work with sea turtles ==
Shortly after moving to South Padre Island, Ila Loetscher developed an affection for and interest in sea turtles, which would come to define the latter half of her life. From 1963 to 1967, she accompanied fellow island residents on trips to Mexico to get eggs for the endangered Kemp's ridley turtle that they would plant and protect on the island, and she received a state license to care for sick and injured sea turtles.

In 1977, Loetscher founded Sea Turtle, Inc., a non-profit corporation focused on protecting and preserving sea turtles, particularly the Kemp's ridley. Her activities on behalf of the turtles gained her the nickname, "The Turtle Lady".

== Awards and appearances ==
- Ila Loetscher was inducted into the Iowa Aviation Hall of Fame in 1991.
- In 2005, she was the first nominee to the Rio Grande Valley Walk of Fame.
- Loetscher appeared in National Geographic documentaries and on numerous television shows, including The Tonight Show Starring Johnny Carson, Late Night with David Letterman, the Today Show, and Real People.
