= Starship flight test 9 =

Ninth launch of SpaceX Starship

- Mission type: Flight test
- Operator: SpaceX

Spacecraft properties
- Spacecraft: Starship Ship 35
- Spacecraft type: Starship (Block 2)
- Manufacturer: SpaceX
- Payload mass: ~16,000 kg (35,000 lb)

Start of mission
- Launch date: May 27, 2025, 23:36:28 UTC (6:36 pm CDT)
- Rocket: Super Heavy (Block 2, B14-2)
- Launch site: Starbase, OLP-1

End of mission
- Destroyed: Ship May 28, 2025, 00:23:16 UTC (7:23:16 CST) Booster May 27, 2025, 23:42:44 UTC (6:42:44 CST)
- Landing site: Super Heavy: Gulf of Mexico (Destroyed during landing burn); Ship: Indian Ocean (Destroyed during reentry)

Payload
- 8 Starlink mass simulators
- Mass: ~16,000 kg (35,000 lb)
- Mission patch SpaceX Starship flight tests

Starship flight test 9 was the ninth flight test of a SpaceX Starship launch vehicle. Ship 35 and Booster 14-2 flew on this test flight. This flight launched on May 27, 2025, at 23:36 UTC (6:36 pm CDT, local time at the launch site). The Ship attempted to achieve the objectives originally planned for Flights 7 and 8, which both failed. This mission's booster, the first Super Heavy to re-fly, underwent experiments in-flight to have its capabilities assessed under off-nominal flight conditions, and was expected to splash down instead of being caught.

Ship 35 reached its planned velocity, the first V2 ship to do so. However, it experienced several failures, including a propellant system leak and loss of attitude control preventing the Ship from achieving most of its in-space objectives, leading SpaceX to terminate the flight by passivating the vehicle. The booster disintegrated over the designated splashdown area in the Gulf of Mexico just after landing burn ignition, however, the booster completed its objective of flying under a more aggressive angle of attack than usual and enabling SpaceX to gather data related to aerodynamic control of the vehicle during descent.

== Background ==
=== Vehicle testing ahead of launch ===
==== Ship 35 ====
Ship 35 was assembled in Mega Bay 2, with the configuration of its heat shield hinting at catch hardware. Ship 35 then underwent 3 rounds of cryo testing at Massey's Test Site on March 11 and 12 and was rolled back to the production site on March 13. It was rolled out to Massey's for static fire on April 29. A static fire attempt on April 29 was scrubbed for an unknown reason during propellant loading. The test was completed on April 30, simulating an "in-space burn" using a single engine. Following a scrubbed attempt earlier in the day, it underwent a second, long duration static fire on May 1. However, according to NASASpaceflight, this static fire did not follow the trend seen previously during Ship 34's static fire, with Ship 35 experiencing an abnormal shutdown around the T+36 second mark. SpaceX has yet to confirm the issue seen during this static fire publicly. Ship 35 was then rolled back to Mega Bay 2 on May 2 for inspection and returned to Massey's on May 10. A static fire attempt on May 11 was scrubbed right after the deluge system activated, subsequently Ship 35 successfully completed a 6 engine long duration static fire (64 seconds), the longest ship static fire seen to date, on May 12. It rolled back to Mega Bay 2 on May 13.

Ship 35 then rolled back to Masseys on May 21, and attempted to conduct testing on May 22, with the first attempt being scrubbed and a subsequent attempt being conducted later the same day. It was then rolled back to Mega Bay 2 on May 23, and had its 8 Starlink simulator satellites installed on May 24. Ship 35 was then rolled to Orbital Launch Pad 1 on May 25, and was stacked a few hours later.

==== Booster 14 ====
B14 was rolled back to Mega Bay 1 for refurbishment on January 18, following its use on Flight 7. It rolled to Orbital Launch Pad 1 (OLP-1) on April 1, where it conducted a static fire test on April 3. Following this test, SpaceX confirmed B14's assignment, as well as stating that 29 of its 33 engines had previously flown. Booster 14 returned to the production site on April 8. Its Hot Staging Ring (HSR) was moved to Mega Bay 1 on April 16 and installed on April 17. B14 subsequently rolled from Mega Bay 1 to OLP-1 on May 12. B14 was then destacked from OLP-1 on May 16, and rolled back to Mega Bay 1 on May 17. It was then rolled to OLP-1 on May 24, and stacked onto OLP-1 on May 25.

=== Impact of Flights 7 and 8 ===
After Flight 6, Elon Musk stated that Flight 8 could be the first 'catch' of the Ship should Flight 7's landing be successful. Due to the failure of S33 to complete its ascent burn, this was delayed to a later mission, along with the likely required insertion burn into low Earth orbit. Before Flight 8, Flight 9 was expected to feature the first ship catch attempt, with U.S. Federal Communications Commission permits for Flight 9 stating the potential for a catch. However, Flight 8 also failed during the ascent burn, delaying the ship catch to a future mission. The U.S. Federal Aviation Administration (FAA) determined that the failure of Flight 8 did not impact public safety on May 22. Besides conducting Ship and Booster static fire tests at Starbase, SpaceX extensively tested individual Raptor 2 engines for longer durations at their McGregor facility to address and mitigate the issues found in Flight 8, among other tests.

==== Return to flight ====
On May 15, the FAA confirmed they had approved license modifications for Flight 9, with SpaceX having submitted their mishap report for Flight 8 on May 13. The FAA then confirmed on May 22 that they had reviewed the mishap report submitted by SpaceX and authorised Starship to return to flight by issuing a Return to Flight Determination. On June 12, the Federal Aviation Administration announced that the mishap investigation into Flight 8 was closed.

== Mission profile ==
The mission profile for flight test 9 was similar to the one planned for the previous flight, targeting a splashdown in the Indian Ocean along with the deployment of eight intentionally destructible Starlink "simulators" which were also expected to reenter over the Indian Ocean. However, unlike past flight tests, the booster did not attempt a catch by the launch tower, instead splashing down in the Gulf of Mexico after multiple experiments during descent, including deliberately not igniting one of the center engines for the landing burn.

=== Flight timeline ===
Time	Event	May 27, 2025
−01:15:00	Flight director conducts a poll and verifies go for propellant loading	Go for propellant loading
−00:51:37	Starship oxidizer (liquid oxygen) load start	Success
−00:45:20	Starship fuel (liquid methane) load start	Success
−00:41:37	Super Heavy fuel (liquid methane) load start	Success
−00:35:52	Super Heavy oxidizer (liquid oxygen) load start	Success
−00:19:40	Super Heavy and Starship engine chill	Success
−00:03:20	Starship propellant load complete	Success
−00:02:50	Super Heavy propellant load complete	Success
−00:00:30	Flight director verifies go for launch	Go for launch
−00:00:10	Flame deflector activation	Success
−00:00:03	Super Heavy engine ignition	Success
+00:00:02	Liftoff	Success
+00:01:02	Max Q (moment of peak mechanical stress on the rocket)	Success
+00:02:35	Super Heavy most engines cutoff (MECO)	Success
+00:02:37	Starship engine ignition and stage separation (hot-staging)	Success
+00:02:47	Super Heavy boostback burn start	Success
+00:03:27	Super Heavy boostback burn shutdown	Success
+00:03:29	Hot-stage jettison	Success
+00:06:14	Super Heavy landing burn start	Partial failure 12 out of 13 engines ignited
+00:06:40	Super Heavy landing burn shutdown	Failure; Booster exploded at T+00:06:16
+00:09:00	Starship engine cutoff (SECO)	Success
+00:18:26	Starlink simulator satellites deploy demo	Failure; Payload door unable to open due to off nominal gas pressures in payload bay.
+00:37:49	Raptor in-space relight demo	—N/a; Skipped due to loss of attitude control
+00:47:50	Starship atmospheric reentry	Failure; Ship passivated due to loss of attitude control. Telemetry lost at T+00:46:48
+01:03:11	Starship is transonic	—N/a
+01:04:26	Starship is subsonic	—N/a
+01:06:11	Starship landing flip	—N/a
+01:06:16	Starship landing burn	—N/a
+01:06:38	Starship splashdown	—N/a
Source: SpaceX

=== Mission summary ===
The Starship vehicle ascended with all 33 Raptor 2 engines on Super Heavy firing nominally from liftoff to stage separation. 29 of those engines were flight proven, and one engine, designated number 314, provided propulsion in flight for the third time. This mission was the first to feature a system to allow the Booster to separate from the Ship in a fully controlled direction; this was done for the booster to fly as efficiently as possible, as to not lose more fuel than necessary. This was achieved by closing some of the vents on the Booster's protective hot staging ring, and the Ship's engine exhaust then pushed the Booster away in the planned direction.

After stage separation, Booster 14-2 was commanded to descend to the Gulf of Mexico at a steeper angle of attack than its previous flight. Since this was the first time SpaceX reused a Super Heavy booster, the company planned to gather data on Booster performance in suboptimal conditions to aid the development of the next generation of Super Heavy boosters. B14 withstood these extreme conditions throughout its descent into the atmosphere until starting its landing burn. It re-lit all 13 center engines, but one engine shut down almost immediately afterward, followed by loss of telemetry at T+6:20. Footage in the webcast showed a fireball erupting shortly before telemetry loss. The booster disintegrated at an altitude of approximately 1 kilometer (3281 feet), and is thought to have succumbed to exceedingly high stresses on its internal fuel transfer tubes, leading to structural failure and mixing of propellants.

Ship 35 performed a full-duration ascent burn to orbital velocity with all of its six engines, the step the previous two Ships failed to achieve. During the coast phase, it started to experience problems with attitude control, preventing it from reentering the Earth's atmosphere in a controlled manner. This prevented SpaceX from performing a planned engine relight test. The planned deployment of Starlink test articles was also aborted due to the attitude control problems. Ship 35 continued streaming onboard views through Starlink, which showed the vehicle tumbling through plasma streams and parts of the vehicle being subjected to thermal damage, until shortly before loss of telemetry at T+46 minutes. The ship disintegrated within the designated reentry zone in the Indian Ocean. After the flight ended, SpaceX CEO Elon Musk additionally reported propellant system leaks and sudden pressure loss in Ship 35, which was responded to by the Ship's flight computers by initiating an automated safing process, in order to safely dispose of the vehicle after it detected it was unrecoverable.

=== Aftermath ===
On May 30, 2025, the US Federal Aviation Administration (FAA) announced that it was requiring SpaceX to conduct a mishap investigation for the Flight 9 mission. The FAA stated that the mishap investigation was only required for Ship 35 due to it not re-entering as planned, despite no debris landing outside of the pre-determined hazard areas. The mishap report does not include B14's explosion above the Gulf of Mexico as its failure was covered by one of the FAA's approved test induced damage exceptions. The mishap investigation was closed on August 15.
