= Sea Turtle, Inc. =

Sea turtle rescue organization

Coordinates: 26.136835°N 97.173648°W

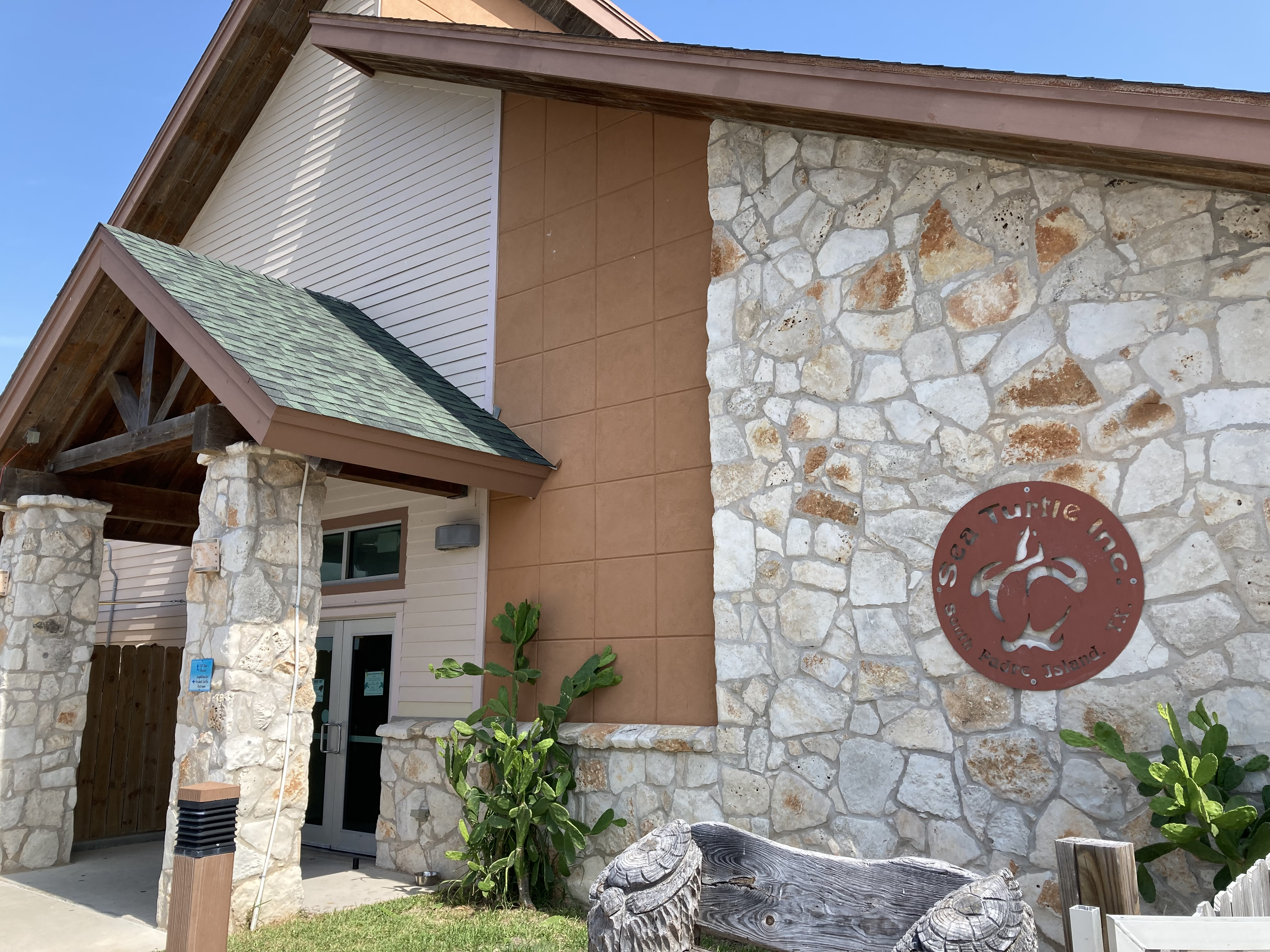
- Slogan: Education, Conservation, Rehabilitation
- Date opened: 1977
- Location: South Padre Island, Texas
- Annual visitors: 25,000
- Website: seaturtleinc.org

Sea Turtle, Inc. is a nonprofit sea turtle rescue and rehabilitation center in South Padre Island, Texas. It is a popular regional ecotourism center, seeing about a quarter million visitors per year. Its mission is to rescue, rehabilitate, and release sick and injured sea turtles; to educate the public about sea turtles and marine conservation; and to help conserve all sea turtle species, particularly those native to the Gulf of Mexico.

== History ==
Sea Turtle, Inc. was founded by Ila Fox Loetscher, known locally as the "Turtle Lady". After the death of her husband David in 1955, Loetscher moved to the Rio Grande Valley where her parents had retired. In 1966, she accompanied Dearl Adams on a trip to Rancho Nuevo, Tamaulipas, the main nesting beach of the Kemp's ridley, to collect sea turtle eggs and relocate them to Texas. Adams gifted her three Kemp's ridley hatchlings, which inspired her to dedicate the rest of her life to protecting sea turtles. Throughout the 1960s and 1970s, Loetscher took in injured sea turtles and gave presentations about them in her backyard before finally creating Sea Turtle, Inc. in 1977.

Loetscher continued to operate Sea Turtle, Inc. out of her home until a dedicated clinic was built in 1999. After her death in 2000, the organization continued her mission of conserving sea turtles. In 2005, Sea Turtle, Inc. received a one-flippered Atlantic green sea turtle that they named Allison. Four years later, intern Tom Wilson developed a prosthesis for Allison that allowed her to swim freely. This was one of the first sea turtle prostheses in the world, and only three other sea turtles in the world are aided by prostheses.

In 2018, Sea Turtle, Inc. further expanded by adding an additional building, the Education Building, which houses the resident sea turtles as well as a small museum. The organization plans on demolishing the original clinic built in 1999 and replacing it with a new, state-of-the-art facility.

During the Texas freeze of February, 2021, more than 12,000 cold-stunned sea turtles stranded on the Texas coast, making this the largest cold-stunning event to date. Sea Turtle, Inc. rescued more than 5,000 during the freeze and released over 2,000. The number of cold-stuns was so large that the organization had to store the animals at the South Padre Island Convention Centre. Climate change is an emerging threat against sea turtles, and Sea Turtle, Inc. plans to be better equipped for similar cold stun events in the future, including constructing a dedicated cold-stun room.

== Conservation efforts and research ==
Aside from serving as a tourist destination and education center, Sea Turtle, Inc. aids in conservation efforts and conducts research that has been published in peer-reviewed journals. The organization cooperates with others across Texas every year to protect sea turtle nests, most of which belong to the Kemp's ridley. In the 2021 nesting season, Sea Turtle, Inc. protected 91 sea turtle nests and released 5,415 hatchlings.

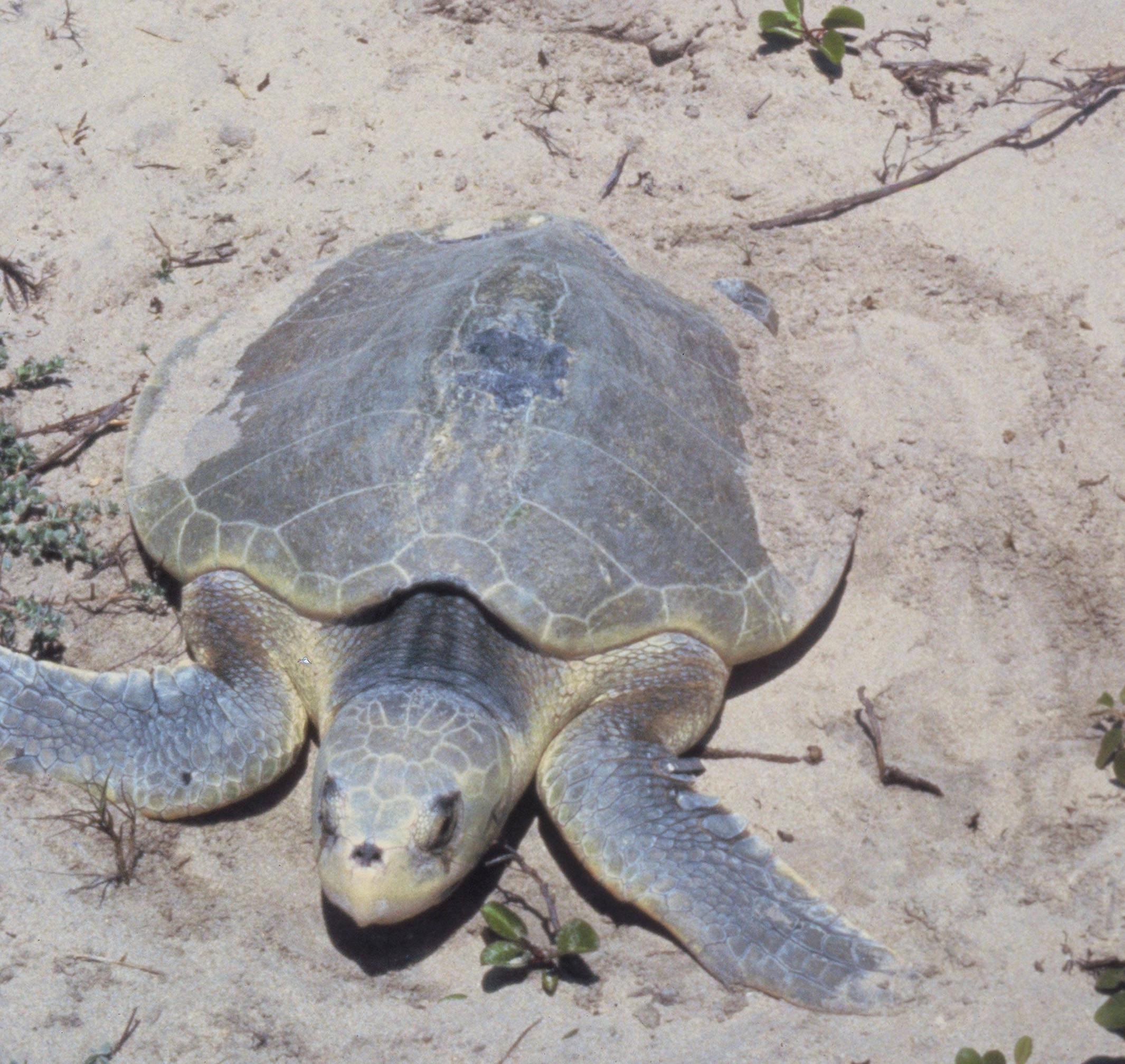
Kemp's ridley sea turtle nesting

== Animals ==
Sea Turtle, Inc. has five non-releasable resident sea turtles of three species. Their names and species in order of acquisition are Gerry (Atlantic green), Merry Christmas (Atlantic Green), Allison (Atlantic green), Hang Ten (Kemp's ridley), and Poppy (loggerhead).

Aside from the residents, more than 100 sea turtles are treated and released at the clinic every year. Most patients are juvenile Atlantic greens, which migrate to the Laguna Madre to forage on the abundant seagrass; however each of the five species of sea turtle common in the Gulf of Mexico, which also includes hawksbills and leatherbacks, has been treated at Sea Turtle, Inc.
