= NASASpaceflight =

Space news website & media organisation

- Screenshot Screenshot of the NASASpaceflight.com website from May 2023
- Website type: YouTube channel, Online newspaper, & internet forum
- Available in: English
- Founder: Chris Bergin
- Website: nasaspaceflight.com
- Commercial: Yes
- Registration: Optional
- Launched: March 16, 2005; 21 years ago
- Current status: Online

YouTube information
- Channel: NASASpaceflight
- Years active: 2019–present
- Genres: Livestreams; Podcasts; spaceflight; news; technology; vlogging; entertainment
- Subscribers: 1.53 million
- Views: 800.56 million
- Last updated: June 21, 2026

NASASpaceflight, often referred to as NSF, is a private aerospace news organization, which operates a YouTube channel, website, a shop and a forum, which launched in 2005, as well as various social media channels covering crewed and uncrewed spaceflight and aerospace engineering news.

NASASpaceflight original reporting has been referenced by various news outlets on spaceflight-specific news, such as MS NOW, USA Today and The New York Times, among others.

NASASpaceflight also produces videos and live streams of rocket launches online, with a special focus on developments at SpaceX's Starbase facility, for which they were recognized with an award by SpaceNews. NSF provides livestream production services to Firefly Aerospace for launches of their Alpha rocket and to Isar Aerospace for launches of their Spectrum rocket. NSF is also currently providing three 24/7 live-streams covering the following:

- The Starship operations at Starbase in Texas;
- The testing of the Raptor, Merlin, and SuperDraco engines near McGregor, Texas;
- Various live videos from Cape Canaveral and Kennedy Space Center in Florida.

NSF was founded by managing editor Chris Bergin, and is owned and operated by John "Das" Galloway. The NSF content is produced by a team of spaceflight reporters, journalists, contributors, editors, photographers, and videographers across the United States and other countries.

NSF offers several tiers of paid membership through their YouTube channel, and either a recurring or lifetime "L2" membership on their website for exclusive photo galleries and access to certain sections of their forum.

NSF also operates the Next Spaceflight website, which keeps track of spaceflight launches, launch pad locations, reusable vehicles, Starship hardware, and maintains a list of all orbital rockets. They also operate a mobile app for prelaunch notifications, launch timelines, and 3D flight simulations.
