= Starship flight test 7 =

Seventh launch of SpaceX Starship

- Mission type: Flight test
- Operator: SpaceX
- Mission duration: 8 minutes, 26 seconds
- Range: ~2,500 km (1,600 mi)

Spacecraft properties
- Spacecraft: Ship 33
- Spacecraft type: Starship (Block 2)
- Manufacturer: Spacex
- Launch mass: 5.5 million kg (12 million pounds)
- Payload mass: ~20,000 kg (44,000 lb)

Start of mission
- Launch date: January 16, 2025, 4:37 pm CST (22:37 UTC)
- Rocket: Super Heavy (Block 2, B14-1)
- Launch site: Starbase, OLP-1
- Deployed from: Boca Chica, Texas

End of mission
- Disposal: Ship: Flight terminated; telemetry was lost due to internal propellant leak
- Destroyed: Ship: January 16, 2025, 4:48:23 pm CST (22:48:23 UTC)
- Landing date: Super Heavy: January 16, 2025, 4:42:55 pm CST (22:42:55 UTC)
- Landing site: Super Heavy: Starbase, OLP-1

Orbital parameters
- Regime: Suborbital
- Perigee altitude: −3,170 km (−1,970 mi)
- Apogee altitude: 146 km (91 mi)
- Inclination: 26.4°

Payload
- 10 Starlink mass simulators
- Mass: ~20,000 kg (44,000 lb)
- Mission patch SpaceX Starship flight tests

Starship flight test 7 (Note: Also officially documented as Starship Flight 7 in a SpaceX report to the FAA, which was released in September 2026 following a FOIA request.) was the seventh flight test of a SpaceX Starship launch vehicle. Flight 7 lifted off from Orbital Launch Pad 1 (OLP-1) on January 16, 2025, at 22:37:00 UTC (4:37 pm CST, local time) at the Starbase launch site in Texas. The prototype vehicles flown were Booster 14, a Block 2 vehicle, and Ship 33, the first Block 2 upper stage, which introduced upgrades in structure, avionics, and other systems. The mission was to follow a trajectory similar to the previous flight, with a planned splashdown in the Indian Ocean about an hour after liftoff, to be imaged by a NASA observation aircraft. It also planned to test a new Starlink satellite deployment system.

With the upgrade to a Block 2 design, Starship surpassed its own record and once again became the heaviest flying object ever built by humankind, at a weight of approximately 5.5 million kilograms (12 million pounds) at liftoff, and the tallest rocket to lift off, succeeding the full Block 1 stack by about 2 meters (6 ft 7 in).

However, during Ship 33's initial burn, its engines experienced premature shutdowns, followed by a total loss of telemetry. The vehicle was observed exploding over the Turks and Caicos Islands two to three minutes later, but did not cause any injuries. This incident prompted regional airspace closures lasting over an hour and triggered an FAA-required mishap investigation. Booster 14 returned to the launch site and was caught by the "chopstick" arms on the launch tower at OLP-1, making it the second booster recovered after Booster 12 during flight test 5.

== Background ==
=== Vehicle testing ahead of launch ===
Ship 33, a Block 2 Starship, flew on flight 7. In October 2024, Ship 33 underwent cryogenic testing. Its counterpart, Booster 14, also underwent cryogenic testing in October. Booster 14 rolled out to OLP-1 and conducted a successful spin prime test and static fire in early December. It then returned to the production site for final pre-flight modifications. Ship 33 also underwent a combination of spin prime and static fire tests later in the month. On January 10, S33 and B14 performed a wet dress rehearsal.

After having previously supported Booster 12 during flight test 5, engine #314 was flown again on Booster 14.

=== NASA imaging of Starship ===
For this launch, NASA planned to use a specially equipped Gulfstream V aircraft (N95NA) to capture images of the Starship's re-entry and peak-heating. The aircraft was positioned to observe the spacecraft as it emerged over the horizon and splashed down in the eastern Indian Ocean in the early morning. The aircraft must fly with its exterior and interior lights extinguished to ensure optimal imaging conditions. This poses significant safety risks, requiring a waiver from aviation authorities and stringent procedures to prevent other aircraft from entering the flight path.

NASA requested an expedited waiver from the US Federal Aviation Administration (FAA) to commence practice flights over the Gulf of Mexico and Southwest Texas in early December. Subsequently, the aircraft was flown to Perth, Australia on January 3 for additional practice flights in the actual landing zone, ahead of the targeted Flight Test 7 on January 16, 2025. If the FAA approved the waiver, Australia's Civil Aviation Safety Authority had indicated its willingness to honor the exemption, allowing for both practice flights and the imaging flight during Flight Test 7.

== Mission profile ==
The mission profile for flight test 7 was expected to be similar to the previous launch, targeting a splashdown in the Indian Ocean. Had the mission successfully entered its intended transatmospheric Earth orbit, it would have attempted an in-space engine relight and deployed ten demisable Starlink "simulators," which were also expected to reenter over the Indian Ocean.

=== Flight timeline ===
Time	Event	January 16, 2025
−01:15:00	Flight director conducts a poll and verifies go for propellant loading	Go for propellant loading
−00:45:54	Starship oxidizer (liquid oxygen) load start	Success
−00:43:00	Starship fuel (liquid methane) load start	Success
−00:41:24	Super Heavy fuel (liquid methane) load start	Success
−00:35:28	Super Heavy oxidizer (liquid oxygen) load start	Success
−00:19:40	Super Heavy and Starship engine chill	Success
−00:03:20	Starship propellant load complete	Success
−00:02:50	Super Heavy propellant load complete	Success
−00:00:30	Flight director verifies go for launch	Go for launch
−00:00:10	Flame deflector activation	Success
−00:00:03	Super Heavy engine ignition	Success
+00:00:02	Liftoff	Success
+00:01:02	Throttle down for max q during ascent (moment of peak mechanical stress on the rocket)	Success
+00:02:32	Super Heavy most engines cutoff (MECO)	Success
+00:02:40	Starship engine ignition and stage separation (hot-staging)	Success
+00:02:44	Super Heavy boostback burn start	Partial failure 9 out of 10 engines reignited
+00:03:38	Super Heavy boostback burn shutdown	Success
+00:03:42	Hot-stage jettison	Success
+00:06:26	Super Heavy is transonic	—N/a
+00:06:31	Super Heavy landing burn start	Success; All 13 engines ignited
+00:06:55	Super Heavy landing burn shutdown and catch	Success
+00:08:53	Starship engine cutoff (SECO)	Failure; Engines began to fail at T+07:39, Telemetry lost at T+08:26, Ship destroyed at T+11:23
+00:17:33	Starlink simulator satellites deploy demo	—N/a
+00:37:33	Raptor in-space relight demo	—N/a
+00:47:25	Starship atmospheric reentry	—N/a
+01:03:12	Starship is transonic	—N/a
+01:04:25	Starship is subsonic	—N/a
+01:06:12	Starship landing flip	—N/a
+01:06:18	Starship landing burn	—N/a
+01:06:38	Starship splashdown	—N/a
Source: SpaceX

== Mission outcome ==
At T+2:40 Ship 33 ignited all six Raptor engines and separated from Booster 14. During the boostback burn, Booster 14 lit 12 of its 13 center engines; one engine aborted because of problems with its igniter system, for which future boosters were already planned to receive a solution. Despite this, the booster successfully returned to the launch site and was subsequently caught by the chopsticks on OLP-1, after performing a landing burn with all 13 center engines. That made it the second booster successfully recovered, following Booster 12 on Flight 5.

During the Ship's ascent burn, a series of cascading engine shutdowns occurred. The first engine failure occurred at T+7:39 when a center engine shut down, followed by the failure of a second center engine at T+8:02 and an adjacent outer Raptor Vacuum engine (RVac) at T+8:04. At T+8:18, another outer RVac shut down, and by T+8:24, the last gimbaling center engine had failed. Transmissions from the vehicle were lost at T+8:26, at an altitude of 146 kilometers (91 mi), 27 seconds before the planned engine shutdown. Around three minutes later, Ship 33 exploded over the Turks and Caicos Islands, causing debris to litter the Caribbean islands, Puerto Rico and the British Virgin Islands. While no injuries were reported, the debris caused minimal damage to infrastructure in Puerto Rico and the British Virgin Islands, and prompted airspace closures in the region for over an hour. The FAA ordered SpaceX to perform a mishap investigation into the breakup, grounding Starship until the inquiry was complete.

After the mission, SpaceX CEO Elon Musk stated that a propellant leak was the probable cause of Ship 33's failure: "Preliminary indications suggest an oxygen/fuel leak in the cavity above the ship engine firewall, which was substantial enough to build pressure beyond the venting capacity." On February 24, 2025, SpaceX stated that "a harmonic response several times stronger in flight than had been seen during testing" likely caused increased stress on Starship's propulsion system and propellant leaks, resulting in "sustained fires" in the aft section of the vehicle. The company also stated that the Autonomous Flight Safety System triggered and destroyed the vehicle.

On March 31, 2025 the FAA announced they had closed the mishap investigation into Flight 7 on March 28, 2025. The announcement confirmed that there were no public injuries and only one minor report of vehicle damage. The probable root cause is stated to be "stronger than anticipated vibrations during flight led to increased stress on, and failure of, the hardware in the propulsion system", with SpaceX confirming that they identified and implemented 11 corrective actions prior to Flight 8. The FAA verified that SpaceX had implemented corrective actions.

== Public response ==
On January 25, a Turks and Caicos Islands Government disaster management team and UK Air Accidents Investigation Branch met with representatives from SpaceX to discuss recovery plans for debris. Citizens were asked to contact SpaceX about the debris' location and time of sighting, but were urged by local officials not to touch any debris without gloves over fears that the debris might contain hazardous chemicals, although SpaceX has since stated there were no hazardous materials present.

SpaceX received backlash from locals who are worried that the 'rapid iterative development' of spacecraft could result in similar incidents happening more frequently in the future, potentially risking the lives and livelihoods of people living or flying in the area. Local officials were delayed in providing information to the public and speculated about potential health risks associated with handling debris—24 hours after residents had already begun cleanup efforts. The swift public response stemmed from fears that the debris would be buried by sand, potentially threatening the island's ecology, a key driver of tourism. Additionally, in spite of SpaceX legally owning all debris from the launch (according to article VIII of the Outer Space Treaty), the public collected and stored the debris.
