= List of Starship launches =

List of launches of SpaceX's fully reusable Starship

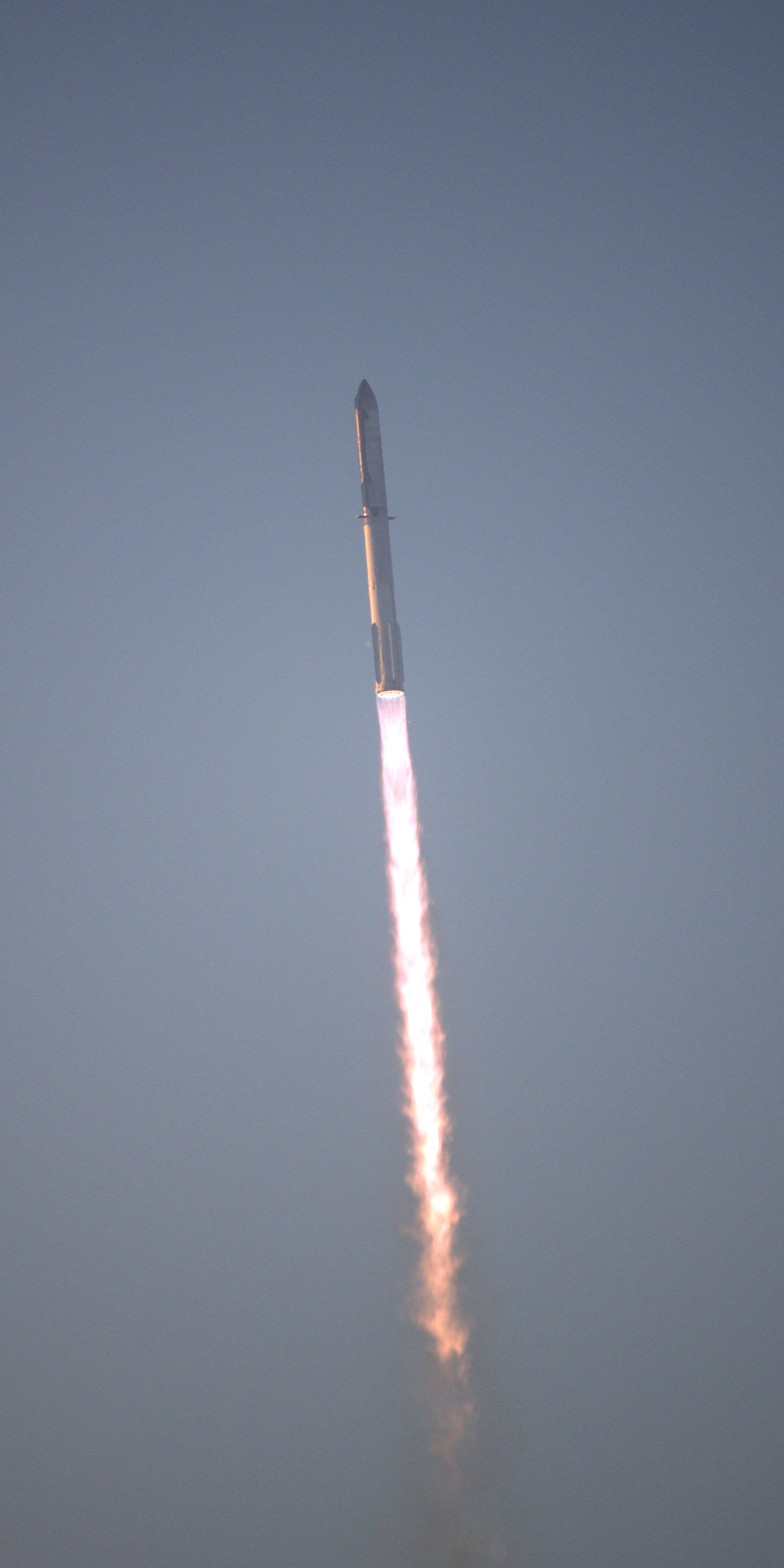
SpaceX Starship during Starship flight test 2

As of November 14, 2026, the SpaceX Starship has been launched 15 times, with 10 successes and 5 failures. SpaceX has developed Starship with the intention of lowering launch costs using economies of scale. It aims to achieve this by reusing both rocket stages, increasing payload mass to orbit, increasing launch frequency, creating a mass-manufacturing pipeline and adapting it to a wide range of space missions. Starship is the latest project in SpaceX's reusable launch system development program and plan to colonize Mars, and is one of two landing systems selected by NASA for the Artemis program's crewed Lunar missions. On September 28, 2026, Flight 14 became the first Starship mission to reach Earth orbit and deploy an operational payload, placing 26 Starlink V3 satellites into low Earth orbit despite an early shutdown of one upper-stage Raptor engine.

SpaceX calls the entire launch vehicle "Starship", which consists of the Super Heavy first stage (booster) and the Starship second stage (ship). There are four versions of the Starship vehicle: Block 1 (Note: Also known as Starship 1, Version 1, or V1), which is retired, Block 2, (Note: Also known as Starship 2, Version 2, or V2), which first flew in Starship flight test 7 and was retired after Starship flight test 11, Block 3 (Note: Also known as Starship 3, Version 3, or V3), which first flew in Starship flight test 12, and Block 4, currently in development. As of November 14, 2026, 6 Block 1 vehicles, 5 Block 2 vehicles, and 4 Block 3 vehicles have flown. Both Starship's first and second stages are planned to be reusable, and are planned to be caught by the tower arms used to assemble the rocket at the pad. This capability was first demonstrated during Starship's fifth flight test, using a Block 1 booster and during Starship’s fifteenth flight test, using a Block 3 ship.

== Launch statistics ==
As of 14 November 2026

=== Booster version ===
- Block 1
- Block 2
- Block 2 (reused)
- Block 3
- Block 4

=== Ship version ===
- Block 1
- Block 2
- Block 3
- Block 4
- Depot
- Starship HLS
- Starship Crew

=== Launch sites ===
- Starbase, OLP-1
- Starbase, OLP-2
- Kennedy, LC-39A
- Cape Canaveral, SLC-37

=== Launch outcomes ===
- Failure
- Success (commercial & government)
- Success (Starlink)
- Planned (commercial & government)
- Planned (Starlink)

=== Booster landings ===
- Tower failure (Note: Committed tower catch attempt with landing failure)
- Tower abort to ocean success (Note: Planned tower catch aborted to controlled flight into water)
- Ocean failure
- Tower success
- Ocean success (Note: Controlled flight into water, no recovery intended)
- Precluded
- No attempt

=== Ship landings ===
- Tower failure
- Ocean failure
- Precluded
- Tower success
- Ocean success
- Ocean recovery (Note: Controlled flight into water, vehicle recovered)
- No attempt

== Past launches ==
=== 2023 ===
Flight No.	Date and time (UTC)	Version, booster (Note: Starship vehicles have a multiple-digit serial number, followed by a hyphen and a number that indicates the flight count. Starship vehicles are in a S#-# format, while boosters are B#-#. For example, B14‑1 and B14‑2 represent the first and second flights of B14. Vehicles without a hyphen were either expended on their first flight or retired after recovery. Missions where a new vehicle is used are marked with a mint-colored background.)	Version, ship	Launch site	Payload	Payload mass	Orbit	Customer	Launch outcome	Booster landing	Ship landing
1	April 20, 2023; 13:33:09	Block 1 B7	Block 1 S24	Starbase, OLP‑1	—N/a	—N/a	Transatmospheric	SpaceX	Failure	Precluded	Precluded
1	Flight 1 was the first with a ship integrated with the Super Heavy booster, the booster was planned to make a powered splashdown in the Gulf of Mexico, and the ship would enter a transatmospheric Earth orbit before reentering and impacting the Pacific Ocean north of Hawaii. Several engines were shut down before and during flight. The vehicle eventually entered an uncontrolled spin before stage separation due to loss of thrust vector control. The flight termination system activated but the vehicle remained intact for 40 more seconds. SpaceX declared this flight a success, as their primary goal was to only clear the pad. The launch resulted in extensive damage to the orbital launch mount and the infrastructures around it, including the propellant tank farm.										
2	November 18, 2023; 13:02:50	Block 1 B9	Block 1 S25	Starbase, OLP‑1	—N/a	—N/a	Transatmospheric	SpaceX	Failure	Failure (gulf)	Precluded
2	Flight 2 had a test flight profile similar to the first flight, with the addition of a new hot-staging technique and the introduction of a water deluge system as part of the ground support equipment at the launch pad. During the first stage ascent, all 33 engines fired to full duration. Starship and Super Heavy successfully accomplished a hot-staging separation. After initiating a flip maneuver and initiating boostback burn, the booster suffered engine shutdowns and was lost. The upper stage ascended nominally until the automated flight termination system destroyed it due to loss of communications from a fire.										

=== 2024 ===
Flight No.	Date and time (UTC)	Version, booster	Version, ship	Launch site	Payload	Payload mass	Orbit	Customer	Launch outcome	Booster landing	Ship landing
3	March 14, 2024; 13:25:00	Block 1 B10	Block 1 S28	Starbase, OLP‑1	—N/a	—N/a	Suborbital	SpaceX	Success	Failure (gulf)	Failure (ocean)
3	Flight 3 included a full-duration burn of the second-stage engines, an internal propellant-transfer demonstration, and a test of the Starlink dispenser door. The planned in-space engine relight of the spacecraft and its hard splashdown into the Indian Ocean did not occur. The booster successfully propelled the spacecraft to staging, with 13 engines ignited for a boostback burn, though six engines shut down prematurely. During the landing burn ignition, only three engines ignited, and the booster was lost around 400 meters above the ocean. At reentry, Ship had an uncontrolled roll and lost telemetry, leading SpaceX to conclude the ship was lost during reentry.										
4	June 6, 2024; 12:50:00	Block 1 B11	Block 1 S29	Starbase, OLP‑1	—N/a	—N/a	Suborbital	SpaceX	Success	Controlled (gulf)	Controlled (ocean)
4	Flight 4 flew a similar trajectory to Flight 3, with the addition of a ship landing burn and soft splashdown. One Raptor engine was lost shortly after liftoff, but the booster performed in accordance to its flight profile and conducted a controlled splashdown in the Gulf of Mexico on a "virtual tower", in preparation for a catch by the launch tower during Flight 5. The spacecraft performed a successful reentry despite severe forward flap damage and conducted a controlled splashdown in the Indian Ocean, within the target region but 6 kilometers from the center.										
5	October 13, 2024; 12:25:00	Block 1 B12	Block 1 S30	Starbase, OLP‑1	—N/a	—N/a	Suborbital	SpaceX	Success	Success (OLP-1)	Controlled (ocean)
5	Flight 5 was the first to achieve booster recovery and complete a flight without engine failures. After stage separation, the booster returned to the launch site and was caught by the launch tower arms despite damage to a chine during descent. Following a coast phase, Ship 30 reentered the atmosphere, performed reentry despite forward flap damage, and executed a landing burn, splashing down at its target in the Indian Ocean.										
6	November 19, 2024; 22:00:00	Block 1 B13	Block 1 S31	Starbase, OLP‑1	Plush banana	Unknown	Transatmospheric	SpaceX	Success	^{Controlled (gulf)} _{Abort (OLP‑1)}	Controlled (ocean)
6	Flight 6 was the second attempt at booster recovery and the final use of a Block 1 upper stage. Heat shield tiles were removed from key areas of Ship 31, which also lacked the ablative backup layer from Flight 5. Following stage separation, the booster was diverted to the ocean near the launch site due to damage to the catch tower during liftoff. The ship completed an in-space engine relight test and re-entered, splashing down in the Indian Ocean during daylight—a first for Starship. Despite a reduced heat shield and steeper re-entry trajectory, Ship 31 sustained minimal flap damage. The flight also carried Starship's first payload, a toy stuffed banana serving as the zero-gravity indicator, which remained onboard throughout the mission.										

=== 2025 ===
In a talk in November 2024, Starbase General Manager Kathy Lueders announced that SpaceX hoped to be able to catch a Starship upper stage sometime in the next 6 months and have as many as 25 launches in 2025. This did not occur. Starship was launched five times in 2025.

Flight No.	Date and time (UTC)	Version, booster	Version, ship	Launch site	Payload	Payload mass	Orbit	Customer	Launch outcome	Booster landing	Ship landing
7	January 16, 2025; 22:37:00	Block 2 B14‑1	Block 2 S33	Starbase, OLP‑1	10 Starlink simulator satellites	~20,000 kg (44,000 lb)	Transatmospheric	SpaceX	Failure	Success (OLP-1)	Precluded
7	Flight 7 was to follow a trajectory similar to the previous mission, with a planned splashdown in the Indian Ocean approximately one hour post-launch. It marked the inaugural flight of a Block 2 Ship, featuring structural, avionics, and other upgrades. The mission also aimed to test the deployment system for 10 Starlink mass simulator satellites. During the Ship's initial burn, its engines experienced premature shutdowns due to a propellant leak larger than the Ship's systems could handle, followed by a total loss of telemetry. SpaceX stated the autonomous flight safety system destroyed the Ship about three minutes after loss of telemetry. The booster successfully returned to the launch site, where it was caught by the launch tower arms on OLP-1 without noticeable damage to the chines.										
8	March 6, 2025; 23:31:02	Block 2 B15‑1	Block 2 S34	Starbase, OLP‑1	4 Starlink simulator satellites	~8,000 kg (18,000 lb)	Transatmospheric	SpaceX	Failure	Success (OLP-1)	Precluded
8	Flight 8 was to follow a trajectory similar to the previous mission, with a planned splashdown in the Indian Ocean. During the Ship's initial burn, several engines shut down and the Ship lost control and later telemetry. The booster was successfully commanded to return to the launch site despite having two engines fail to relight for its boostback burn. One of the failed engines managed to reignite for the catch, which was successful.										
9	May 27, 2025; 23:36:28	Block 2 B14-2	Block 2 S35	Starbase, OLP‑1	8 Starlink simulator satellites	~16,000 kg (35,000 lb)	Transatmospheric	SpaceX	Failure	Failure (gulf)	Failure (ocean)
9	Flight 9 was the first to reuse a Super Heavy booster, along with 29 engines having been used on a flight, which completed ascent and boostback into a high angle of attack but was lost before splashdown in the Gulf of Mexico. The ship reached engine cutoff but failed to deploy its payload of eight Starlink simulator satellites and experienced a fuel leak, resulting in a loss of control. The ship was passivated before reentry and broke up over the Indian Ocean.										
10	August 26, 2025; 23:30:00	Block 2 B16	Block 2 S37	Starbase, OLP‑1	8 Starlink simulator satellites	~16,000 kg (35,000 lb)	Transatmospheric	SpaceX	Success	Controlled (gulf)	Controlled (ocean)
10	Flight 10 was delayed by around two months because the ship originally designated for the flight was lost during testing. The booster ignited all thirty-three engines, though it lost one during the ascent burn. It would continue to complete its mission, splashing down in the Gulf of Mexico after simulating an engine out. The ship reached the desired trajectory and deployed all eight of its Starlink simulators. It then relit a single Raptor engine in space, followed by atmospheric entry. During descent through the atmosphere, there was substantial damage to the engine section. Despite this, S37 was able to softly splash down within three meters of its target site in the Indian Ocean.										
11	October 13, 2025; 23:23:00	Block 2 B15‑2	Block 2 S38	Starbase, OLP‑1	8 Starlink simulator satellites	~16,000 kg (35,000 lb)	Transatmospheric	SpaceX	Success	Controlled (gulf)	Controlled (ocean)
11	Flight 11 was the last flight of Block 2 vehicles, as well as the last flight from Pad-1 before its retrofit. It flew a similar profile to the previous two flights, with twenty-four engines flying for a second time on Booster 15. The booster performed nominally during its flight, with the only anomaly being the loss of a Raptor engine on the boostback burn, though it would later reignite on the landing burn. The ship, like on the previous flight, made it to SECO before deploying its eight Starlink simulators. Following this, a single Raptor engine was lit in space, with the ship reentering shortly afterwards. Unlike on Flight 10, the ship was mostly undamaged from heat on reentry, despite the intentional removal of several tiles. S38 landed on target in the Indian Ocean.										

=== 2026 ===
Flight No.	Date and time (UTC)	Version, booster	Version, ship	Launch site	Payload	Payload mass	Orbit	Customer	Launch outcome	Booster landing	Ship landing
12	May 22, 2026; 22:30:00	Block 3 B19	Block 3 S39	Starbase, OLP‑2	20 Starlink simulator satellites & 2 modified Starlink V3	~37,500 kg (82,700 lb)	Transatmospheric	SpaceX	Success	Failure (gulf)	Controlled (ocean)
12	Flight 12 was originally intended to feature Booster 18 and Ship 39; however, Booster 18 was scrapped after sustaining severe damage during testing. This mission marked the debut of the "Block 3" vehicle iteration and the inaugural use of Starbase's second launch pad. It aimed for the controlled splashdown of both the Booster and the Ship. The mission followed a flight profile similar to previous tests, with the ship targeting a trajectory just shy of orbit. During ascent, the booster performed nominally despite losing a single outboard Raptor engine. However, following hot-staging, Booster 19 only successfully relit 20 of the 33 engines intended for the boostback burn, the majority of which failed during startup. The burn was then aborted after only a few seconds. During the landing sequence, only one engine relit, leading the vehicle to impact the water at high speed. Ship 39 suffered the loss of one Raptor Vacuum engine during its ascent, but the vehicle's engine-out capability allowed it to successfully reach its scheduled engine cutoff (SECO). While the ship successfully deployed 20 satellite mass simulators and two modified functional Starlink satellites, the planned in-space Raptor relight was skipped. The two functional satellites were used to test upcoming Starlink V3 hardware, capture and relay footage of the Starship in space, and inspect its heat shield. Finally, the ship completed a nominal reentry and a successful landing flip using two engines as planned.										
13	July 24, 2026; 22:51:00	Block 3 B20	Block 3 S40	Starbase, OLP‑2	20 Starlink V3	~34,000 kg (75,000 lb) (Note: Extrapolated from payload mass of flight 12.)	Transatmospheric	SpaceX	Success	Failure (gulf)	Controlled (ocean)
13	Flight 13 followed a flight profile similar to previous tests. Liftoff, hot staging and boostback were nominal. During the attempted landing burn, Booster 20 only lit 10 of the planned 13 engines on the landing burn and after losing five more, impacted the water at high speed. Flight 13 featured the first deployment of Starlink V3 satellites, which followed the trajectory of the ship and, after testing, burned up in the atmosphere as planned. After its simulated landing over the Indian Ocean, the ship splashed down and tipped over as planned. For the first time, the ship survived this, allowing SpaceX to get more images of the heat shield tiles, flaps and engine bay afterwards.										
14	September 28, 2026; 12:48	Block 3 B21	Block 3 S41	Starbase, OLP‑2	Starlink: Group 31-1	~44,000 kg (97,000 lb)	LEO	SpaceX	Success	Controlled (gulf)	Controlled (ocean)
14	Flight 14 was Starship's first orbital mission and first deployment of an operational payload. Booster 21 completed ascent, hot-staging and boostback before making a controlled splashdown in the Gulf of Mexico, despite several engines shutting down during descent. During ascent, one of Ship 41's engines shut down prematurely, but flight controllers proceeded with orbital insertion. Ship 41 reached an orbit at an altitude of approximately 275 kilometres (171 mi), deployed all 26 Starlink V3 satellites, and made a controlled splashdown in the Pacific Ocean at about 15:57 UTC, roughly three hours after launch. The planned six-orbit mission was shortened to just under two orbits following payload deployment and an initial health check, foregoing the planned coast period.										
15	November 13, 2026; 22:47:36	Block 3 B22	Block 3 S42	Starbase, OLP‑2	Starlink Group 31-2	~44,000 kg (97,000 lb)	LEO	SpaceX	Success	^{Controlled (gulf)} _{Abort (OLP‑2)}	Success (OLP-2)
15	Flight 15 was planned to attempt the first catch of Starship's upper stage on this flight, alongside a booster catch, which had not been attempted since Flight 8. After staging, the booster began to perform the boostback burn. However, it was cut short due to insufficient fuel quantities, and Booster 22 diverted to an offshore splashdown successfully. The ship deployed all 26 Starlink satellites and returned to Starbase twenty-two and a half hours after being launched, which made for the longest Starship flight to date. S42 was caught by the launch tower, nicknamed Mechazilla, around 22 hours after it lifted off there. This was the first time a Starship upper stage was caught by the tower.										

== Future launches ==
Future launches are listed chronologically when firm plans are in place. Launches are expected to take place "no earlier than" (NET) the listed date.

=== 2026 ===
Date and time (UTC)	Version, booster	Version, ship	Launch site	Payload	Orbit	Customer
December 10, 2026	Block 3 B23	Block 3 S43	Kennedy, LC-39A	Starlink 30-1	LEO	SpaceX
December 10, 2026	Flight 16 is scheduled for no earlier than December 10, 2026, with the Starlink 30-1 mission. It is expected to be the first Starship mission to launch from Launch Complex 39A at the Kennedy Space Center in Florida.					

=== 2027 ===
Date and time (UTC)	Version, booster	Version, ship	Launch site	Payload	Orbit	Customer
Q1 2027	Block 3	Block 3	TBA	—N/a	LEO	NASA
Q1 2027	Launch of the Starship target (a prototype version of the Propellant Depot) for the propellant transfer demonstration mission.					
Q1 2027	Block 3	Block 3	TBA	Propellant	LEO	NASA
Q1 2027	Launch of the Starship chaser (a prototype version of the tanker) for the propellant transfer demonstration mission.					
Mid 2027	Block 3	Block 3	TBA	Artemis III	LEO	NASA
Mid 2027	Artemis III will conduct a docking test in low Earth orbit between Orion and a prototype Starship Human Landing System (HLS). Starship will serve as a docking target with an IDSS port mounted on its nose.					
2027	Unknown	Unknown	TBA	Superbird-9	GTO	SKY Perfect JSAT
2027	Superbird-9 is a high-throughput satellite for SKY Perfect JSAT, based on Airbus's OneSat product line.					
2027	Unknown	Depot	TBA	Propellant Depot	LEO	NASA
2027	Launch of a Starship propellant depot into low Earth orbit for long-term storage propellant delivered by Starship tanker spacecraft for subsequent transfer to a Starship HLS vehicle.					
Q3 2027	Unknown	Unknown	TBA	Propellant	LEO	NASA
Q3 2027	A series of Starship tanker launches to deliver propellant to the depot. An estimated six to 22 launches are required to support the uncrewed Starship HLS lunar landing demonstration mission.					
Q4 2027	Unknown	HLS	TBA	Uncrewed Lunar Demo	Lunar	NASA
Q4 2027	Uncrewed Starship HLS demonstration mission to the Moon, including a lunar landing and return to lunar orbit, planned before the crewed Artemis IV mission.					
2027	Unknown	HLS	TBA	Astrolab FLEX rover Possible rideshare	Lunar	Astrolab
2027	Flexible Logistics and Exploration (FLEX) rover will include 1,000 kilograms (2,200 lb) of customer payloads.					
2027	Unknown	HLS	TBA	ISRU Processing System Possible rideshare	Lunar	LSA
2027	In April 2023, the Luxembourg Space Agency (LSA) and OffWorld Europe announced a partnership to develop a system for extracting, processing, storing, and using water ice from the lunar surface through in situ resource utilization. Overseen by the European Space Agency, the project combines LSA's and OffWorld Europe's expertise, with a technology demonstration planned for launch to the Moon in 2027 aboard the first Starship HLS mission for the Artemis program. The mission is expected to require an estimated high-teens number of Starship refueling flights beforehand.					

=== 2028 and beyond ===
Date and time (UTC)	Version, booster	Version, ship	Launch site	Payload	Orbit	Customer
2028	Unknown	Depot	TBA	Propellant Depot	LEO	NASA
2028	SpaceX will launch a depot to store propellant for Human Landing System (HLS) flights.					
2028	Unknown	Unknown	Propellant	Propellant	LEO	NASA
2028	Tanker launch for Artemis IV. At least one tanker will be needed for most launches beyond LEO, and anywhere from six to twenty two tanker flights for a lunar landing.					
2028	Unknown	HLS	TBA	Crewed Lunar Demo	Lunar	NASA
2028	Artemis IV is expected to be the first crewed lunar landing since Apollo 17. An unknown number of refueling flights, estimated to be in the high tens, will be required prior to the mission.					
2029	Unknown	Unknown	TBA	Starlab	LEO	Voyager Space/Airbus
2029	Starlab is a planned commercial space station.					
2029	Unknown	HLS	TBA	Eagle Rover Possible rideshare	Lunar	Lunar Outpost
2029	The Eagle Rover has been selected by NASA for study as a Lunar Terrain Vehicle.					
2029	Unknown	Unknown	TBA	Starfall Capsule	TBA	Exolaunch
2029	An unspecified payload for Exolaunch carried by one or more Starfall capsules.					
2030	Unknown	Unknown	TBA	Haven-2 Core Module	LEO	VAST
2030	Launch of Haven-2 Core module.					
2032	Unknown	HLS	TBA	Lunar Cruiser Possible rideshare	Lunar	JAXA/NASA
2032	The Lunar Cruiser is a crewed pressurized lunar rover being developed jointly by JAXA and Toyota that astronauts can drive and live in on the Moon.					
2035	Unknown	Unknown	TBA	Vast artificial gravity station Module 1	LEO	VAST
2035	First module for Vast's 100 m spinning artificial gravity station.					
2035	Unknown	Unknown	TBA	Vast artificial gravity station Module 2	LEO	VAST
2035	Second module for Vast's artificial gravity station.					
2035	Unknown	Unknown	TBA	Vast artificial gravity station Module 3	LEO	VAST
2035	Third module for Vast's artificial gravity station.					
2035	Unknown	Unknown	TBA	Vast artificial gravity station Module 4	LEO	VAST
2035	Fourth module for Vast's artificial gravity station.					
2035	Unknown	Unknown	TBA	Vast artificial gravity station Module 5	LEO	VAST
2035	Fifth module for Vast's artificial gravity station.					
2035	Unknown	Unknown	TBA	Vast artificial gravity station Module 6	LEO	VAST
2035	Sixth module for Vast's artificial gravity station.					
TBA	Unknown	Unknown	TBA	Uncrewed Mars Demo	TMI	
TBA	SpaceX plans to launch around five Starship upper stages to Mars, which would attempt to land on an as of yet unspecified location on the Martian surface upon arrival at Mars, as part of their iterative and incremental cycle of development. The Italian Space Agency contracted SpaceX in 2025 for delivering several experiments to the Martian surface on the first Starship flight to Mars.					

== See also ==
- List of Starship upper stage flight tests
- List of Starship vehicles
- List of Super Heavy boosters
- List of Falcon 9 and Falcon Heavy launches
- List of New Glenn launches
- List of Space Launch System launches
