= Starship flight test 13 =

Rocket flight test

- Mission type: Flight test
- Operator: SpaceX

Spacecraft properties
- Spacecraft: Starship Ship 40
- Spacecraft type: Starship (Block 3)
- Manufacturer: SpaceX

Start of mission
- Launch date: July 24, 2026, 22:51:00 UTC (17:51:00 CDT)
- Rocket: Super Heavy (Block 3, B20)
- Launch site: Starbase, OLP-2

End of mission
- Landing site: Super Heavy: Gulf of Mexico; Ship: Indian Ocean

Payload
- 20 × Starlink V3
- Mass: ~34,100 kg (75,200 lb)

Starship flight test 13 was the thirteenth flight test of the SpaceX Starship launch system, using Booster 20 and Ship 40.

During the initial launch attempt on July 16, 2026, the vehicle's flight software triggered an automatic abort at T−0 just prior to liftoff after six Raptor engines had problems with their oxidizer turbo-pumps and failed to meet flight speeds, protecting both the vehicle and the launch pad from damage. After another scrub due to weather conditions, the third launch attempt on July 24 was successful and became the first Starship flight to deploy operational satellites with 20 Starlink satellites deployed in suborbit that made contact with the Starlink constellation. Booster 20's ocean landing burn failed when only ten of 13 Raptor engines relit, with subsequent shutdowns causing destruction on impact.

== Background ==
=== Federal clearance for flight ===
Following Starship flight test 12, a mishap investigation report was completed to secure flight clearance. The US Federal Aviation Administration (FAA) concluded its review on July 13, clearing the path for subsequent Starship launches.

=== Vehicle testing ahead of launch ===
==== Booster 20 ====
Following assembly, Booster 20 (B20) was transported to the Massey's test site on June 5, 2026, where it completed a cryogenic proof test the following day. On July 10, after moving to Orbital Launch Pad 2, the booster completed a major pre-flight milestone by executing a successful, full-duration, 33-engine static fire.

==== Ship 40 ====
Stacking operations for Ship 40 (S40) concluded on March 2, 2026, with cryogenic testing completing at Massey's in early May. Following engine installation, the vehicle returned to Massey's on June 23. S40 completed a successful single-engine static fire on June 25 after a brief diagnostic run. After returning briefly to the production site for final checks, S40 was transported back to Massey's, where it fired all six engines on July 1.

=== Launch attempts ===
SpaceX initially targeted Thursday, July 16, for flight 13; however, the flight was scrubbed at T-minus 0 seconds as four of the 33 Raptor engines failed to ignite. Initially, the second launch attempt was scheduled for Monday, July 20, but was later rescheduled for Thursday, July 23. The date was moved to July 24 due to Tropical Storm Bertha.

== Mission profile ==
Attempt	Planned	Result	Turnaround	Reason	Decision point	Weather go (%)	Notes
1	16 Jul 2026, 6:45:00 pm	Scrubbed	—	Technical	16 Jul 2026, 6:45 pm (T−00:00:00)	90	Automatic abort triggered during ignition due to issues with six LOX turbopumps. Two engines were preemptively replaced.
2	23 Jul 2026, 6:45:00 pm	Scrubbed	7 days 0 hours 0 minutes	Weather	23 Jul 2026, 3:08 pm (T−02:37:00)		SpaceX stated that the scrub was to allow visual examination of the heat tiles during ascent.
3	24 Jul 2026, 6:51:00 pm	Success	1 day 0 hours 6 minutes				

The flight profile built upon previous test flights. Starship flew on a controlled suborbital trajectory designed to fall just short of orbit, while the Super Heavy booster executed a flip and boostback burn before suffering multiple engine failures and splashing down hard in the Gulf of Mexico.

The upper stage carried 20 next-generation Starlink satellites, six of which were equipped with advanced cameras to inspect S40 in space, mirroring the Space Shuttle's rendezvous pitch maneuver (RPM). Because the flight was intentionally suborbital, the satellites reentered the atmosphere about 20 minutes after deployment. To further demonstrate its advancing capabilities, the ship performed an in-space Raptor relight before executing a targeted splashdown and landing flip maneuver in the Indian Ocean. The ship splashed down and remained intact and operational after tipping over, a first for the vehicle, allowing a drone to inspect the heat shield and engines.

=== Flight timeline ===
The timeline below reflects the initial aborted July 16 attempt, as well as the actual launch on July 24.

Time	Event	July 16, 2026	July 24, 2026
−00:50:00	SpaceX flight director conducts poll and verifies go for propellant load	Go for propellant loading	Go for propellant loading
−00:37:30	Ship LOX (liquid oxygen) load underway	Success	Success
−00:37:00	Booster LOX load underway	Success	Success
−00:35:25	Booster fuel (liquid methane) load underway	Success	Success
−00:34:48	Ship fuel load underway	Success	Success
−00:21:30	Raptor begins engine chill on booster and ship	Success	Success
−00:02:50	Booster propellant load complete	Success	Success
−00:02:10	Ship propellant load complete	Success	Success
−00:00:30	SpaceX flight director verifies go for launch	Success	Success
−00:00:17	Flame diverter activation	Success	Success
−00:00:03	Raptor ignition sequence begins	Aborted at T−00:00:00. The flight software aborted ignition when four of Super Heavy's 33 engines did not start.	Success
+00:00:00	Liftoff	—N/a	Success
+00:00:58	Max Q (moment of peak aerodynamic stress on the rocket)	—N/a	Success
+00:02:18	Super Heavy MECO (most engines cut off)	—N/a	Success
+00:02:21	Hot-staging (Starship Raptor ignition and stage separation)	—N/a	Success
+00:02:25	Super Heavy boostback burn start	—N/a	Success
+00:03:03	Super Heavy boostback burn shutdown	—N/a	Boostback burn ended early at T+2:55
+00:06:27	Super Heavy landing burn start	—N/a	Only ten engines relit with multiple engines shutting down shortly after
+00:06:53	Super Heavy landing burn shutdown	—N/a	Vehicle impacted the water and was destroyed
+00:08:05	Starship engine cutoff (SECO)	—N/a	Success
+00:16:40	Payload deploy demo start	—N/a	Success
+00:27:39	Payload deploy demo complete	—N/a	Success
+00:38:58	Raptor in-space relight demo	—N/a	Success
+00:47:30	Starship entry begins	—N/a	Success
+01:02:23	Starship is transonic	—N/a	Success
+01:03:01	Starship is subsonic	—N/a	Success
+01:05:01	Landing burn start	—N/a	Success
+01:05:03	Landing flip	—N/a	Success
+01:05:12	Landing burn 3 to 2 engines	—N/a	Success
+01:05:19	Landing burn 2 to 1 engine	—N/a	Success
+01:05:21	Splashdown	—N/a	Success
Source: SpaceX

== Recovery ==
Elon Musk confirmed that SpaceX would attempt recovery efforts of Ship 40 on July 28. The SpaceX recovery vessel Go Australis remained near Ship 40 for a few days after splashdown, later joined by tugs Normand Ranger and Skimmer Tide a half day later. Musk stated on X that recovery of Ship 40 was looking doubtful on August 7. Normand Ranger and Go Australis towed Ship 40 to waters off Christmas Island on August 18, with the Australian Space Agency confirming the Australian government was aiding in recovery operations. SpaceX stated on X that engineers will conduct additional analysis on site before attempting to return Ship 40 to Starbase, Texas. An exclusion zone was established around Ship 40 and Normand Ranger at Christmas Island. On August 23, semi-submersible heavy-lift ship Forte arrived at Christmas Island, to transport Ship 40 back to Starbase. Ship 40 was loaded onto Forte on August 26 after engineers collected heatshield samples and data from the ship. On October 7, 2026 Ship 40 was successfully shipped to Starbase, Texas and recovered. Ship 40 was raised into a vertical position in Mega Bay 2 on October 12, the day after it rolled back to the production site from the Port of Brownsville.

== Aftermath ==
Flight Test 13 resulted in a successful test of Ship 40, from stage separation to splash down, completing verification for a future orbital flight with testing of an in-space Starship engine relight. Shortly after flight test 13, Elon Musk announced that flight test 14 would include catching the Starship with the "Mechazilla" launch tower which would first require the Starship to have entered orbit.

== See also ==
- List of spaceflight launches in July–September 2026
