= List of SpaceX launches =

List of SpaceX launches may refer to:

- List of Falcon 1 launches, SpaceX's retired first launch vehicle
- List of Falcon 9 and Falcon Heavy launches, SpaceX's current operational launch vehicles
- List of Starship launches, SpaceX's upcoming launch vehicle in development
