= Starship flight test 11 =

Eleventh launch of SpaceX Starship

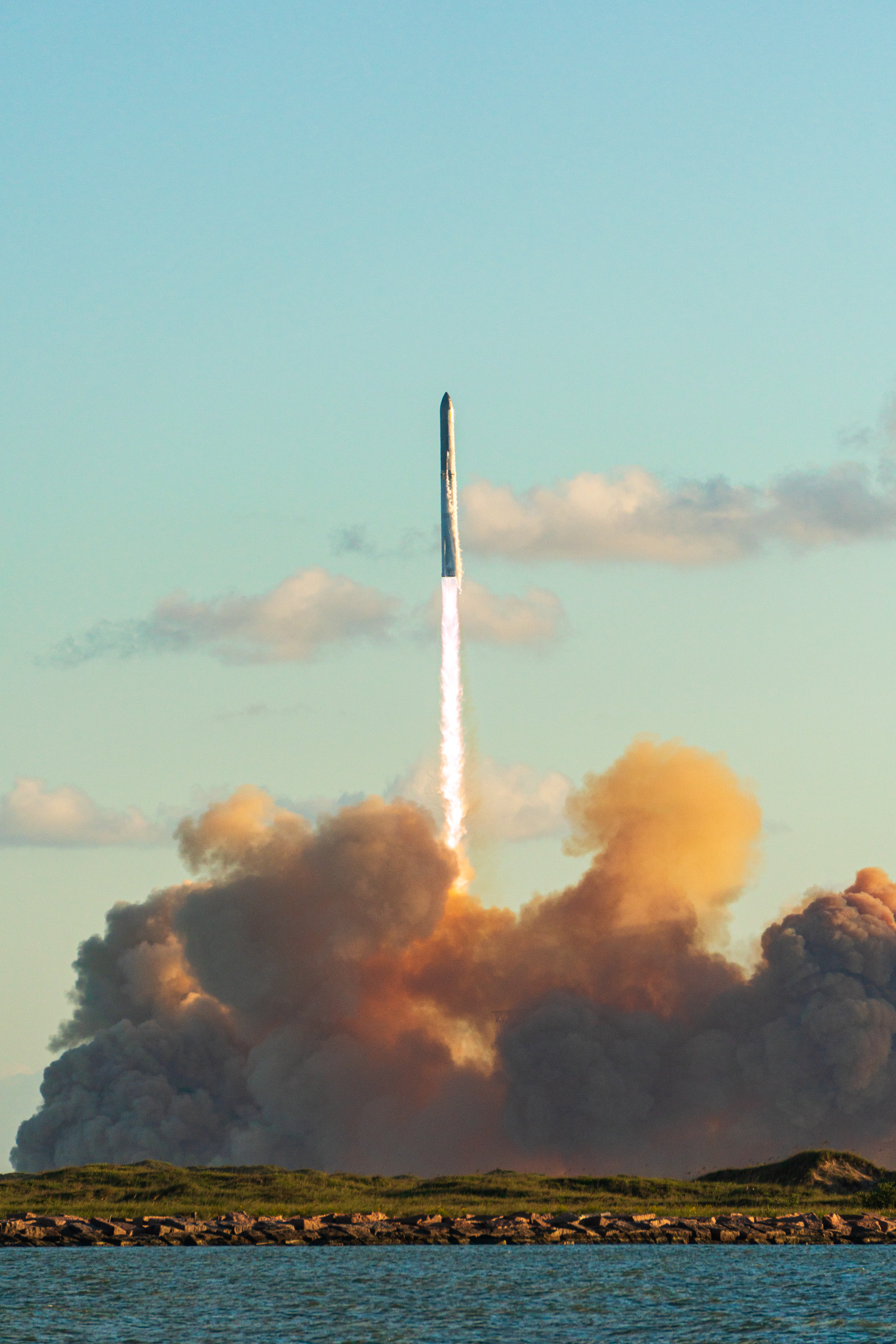
- Mission type: Flight test
- Operator: SpaceX

Spacecraft properties
- Spacecraft: Ship 38
- Spacecraft type: Starship (Block 2)
- Manufacturer: SpaceX

Start of mission
- Launch date: October 13, 2025 23:23 UTC (6:23 pm CDT)
- Rocket: Super Heavy (Block 2, B15-2)
- Launch site: Starbase, Pad-1

End of mission
- Landing date: Super Heavy: October 13, 2025, 23:29:36 UTC; Ship: October 14, 2025, 00:29:25 UTC
- Landing site: Super Heavy: Gulf of Mexico; Ship: Indian Ocean northwest of Western Australia (19°S 107°E)

Orbital parameters
- Perigee altitude: Initial: −6 to 4 km (−3.7 to 2.5 mi); After relight: ≈50 km (31 mi)
- Apogee altitude: 192 km (119 mi)
- Inclination: 26.5°

Payload
- 8 Starlink mass simulators
- Mass: ~16,000 kg (35,000 lb)

Starship flight test 11 was the eleventh flight test of a SpaceX Starship launch vehicle, using Booster 15 and Ship 38. It was the last flight of a Block 2 Starship vehicle, and flew a similar profile to the previous two flights. According to Eric Berger, Flight 11 included additional tests of the Raptor engines. SpaceX stated that the ship had some tile experiments, including removing tiles that lack an ablative backup section. The booster, with 24 flight-proven engines, tested configurations planned to be used by Block 3 boosters upon landing before being expended.

== Background ==
=== Vehicle testing ahead of launch ===
==== Booster 15 ====
B15 was rolled back to Mega Bay 1 on March 8 for refurbishment, after having flown on flight 8. It was then rolled to Pad 1 on September 5, and stacked onto the Orbital Launch Mount (OLM) on September 6. B15 then performed a 33 engine, 9 second duration static fire on September 7. Booster 15 then rolled back to Mega Bay 1 on September 8. B15 was rolled back to Pad 1 on October 8 and was lifted onto the OLM.

==== Ship 38 ====
S38 was rolled to the Massey's test site for cryogenic testing on July 27. On July 30, S38 conducted three separate cryogenic proof tests, followed by a return to the production site on August 1. Engine Installation began on August 14 with two Vacuum Raptors entering Mega Bay 2. S38 rolled out to the OLP-1 at the Starbase Launch Site on September 17, S38 was then lifted onto the Launch Mount for static fire testing. The first attempt at a static fire was aborted as the vehicle began propellant load on September 18. It re-attempted a static fire, but it was aborted for unknown reasons during propellant loading. Ship 38 then conducted a 6 engine, 8 second duration static fire on September 22. On October 11, Ship 38 was integrated with its payload and lifted atop Booster 15.

== Mission profile ==
The mission profile for Flight Test 11 was largely consistent with that of the preceding test. The spacecraft executed a controlled splashdown in the Indian Ocean, while the booster conducted landing-burn experiments over the Gulf of Mexico. The mission also included the deployment of eight Starlink mass simulators and an in-flight engine relight test.

=== Flight timeline ===
Time	Event	October 13, 2025
−01:15:00	SpaceX flight director conducts poll and verifies go for propellant load	Success
−00:53:00	Ship fuel (liquid methane) load underway	Success
−00:46:10	Ship LOX (liquid oxygen) load underway	Success
−00:41:15	Booster fuel load underway	Success
−00:35:52	Booster LOX load underway	Success
−00:19:40	Raptor begins engine chill on booster and ship	Success
−00:03:20	Ship propellant load complete	Success
−00:02:50	Booster propellant load complete	Success
−00:00:30	SpaceX flight director verifies go for launch	Success
−00:00:10	Flame deflector activation	Success
−00:00:03	Raptor ignition sequence begins	Success
+00:00:02	Liftoff	Success
+00:01:02	Max Q (moment of peak aerodynamic stress on the rocket)	Success
+00:02:37	Super Heavy MECO (most engines cut off)	Success
+00:02:39	Hot-staging (Starship Raptor ignition and stage separation)	Success
+00:02:49	Super Heavy boostback burn start	Partial failure 9 out of 10 engines relit
+00:03:38	Super Heavy boostback burn shutdown	Success
+00:03:40	Hot-stage jettison	Success
+00:06:20	Super Heavy landing burn start	Success
+00:06:36	Super Heavy landing burn shutdown	Success
+00:08:58	Starship engine cutoff (SECO)	Success
+00:18:33	Payload deploy demo start	Success
+00:25:33	Payload deploy demo complete	Success
+00:37:49	Raptor in-space relight demo	Success
+00:47:43	Starship entry	Success
+01:03:30	Starship is transonic	—N/a
+01:03:52	Starship is subsonic	—N/a
+01:05:58	Landing burn start	Success
+01:06:00	Landing flip	Success
+01:06:09	Landing burn 3 to 2 engines	Success
+01:06:25	Splashdown	Success
Source: SpaceX
