= Flight 14 =

Flight 14 may refer to:

- FedEx Express Flight 14, an air cargo flight involved in an accident in 1997
- Starship flight 14, a space mission that took place in 2026.
