= List of Super Heavy boosters =

Since April 2023, Super Heavy has been launched 15 times, with 10 successes and 5 failures. Starship, the vehicle Super Heavy composes when combined with the Starship spacecraft, has been developed with the intention of lowering launch costs using economies of scale. SpaceX aims to achieve this by reusing both rocket stages, increasing payload mass to orbit, increasing launch frequency, creating a mass-manufacturing pipeline and adapting it to a wide range of space missions. Starship is the latest project in SpaceX's reusable launch system development program and plan to colonize Mars.

There are currently three planned versions of Super Heavy: Block 1 (also known as Version 1 or V1), Block 2, and Block 3. As of September 2026, 6 Block 1 vehicles and 4 Block 2 vehicles have flown., and Block 3 vehicles have flown 2 times. The Super Heavy booster is reusable, and is recovered via large arms on the tower capable of catching the descending vehicle. As of May 2025, 2 boosters have been refurbished and subsequently flown at least a second time, though 3 boosters, Booster 12, 14, and 15, have been recovered after flight, with Booster 12 having damage to one of its chine sections, and Booster 14 being reused.

== Development ==
S/N	Type	Launches	Launch date	Flight No. (Note: Entries with mint colored background denote flights using new boosters.)	Turnaround time	Launch (pad)	Landing (location)	Status
BN1	—N/a	0	—N/a	—	—N/a	—N/a	—N/a	Scrapped
B3	—N/a	0	—N/a	—	—N/a	—N/a	—N/a	Scrapped
B4	—N/a	0	—N/a	—	—N/a	—N/a	—N/a	Scrapped
B5	—N/a	0	—N/a	—	—N/a	—N/a	—N/a	Scrapped
B7	Block 1	1	April 20, 2023	Starship flight test 1	—N/a	Failure (OLP-1)	Precluded	Destroyed
B8	Block 1	0	—N/a	—	—N/a	—N/a	—N/a	Scrapped
B9	Block 1	1	November 18, 2023	Starship flight test 2	—N/a	Failure (OLP-1) (Note: The first-stage booster performed nominally during ascent until stage separation; a failure however occurred on the second stage, where a planned liquid oxygen vent resulted in onboard fires and flight termination activation.)	Failure (gulf)	Destroyed
B10	Block 1	1	March 14, 2024	Starship flight test 3	—N/a	Success (OLP-1)	Failure (gulf)	Destroyed
B11	Block 1	1	June 6, 2024	Starship flight test 4	—N/a	Success (OLP-1)	Controlled (gulf)	Expended
B12	Block 1	1	October 13, 2024	Starship flight test 5	—N/a	Success (OLP-1)	Success (OLP-1)	Retired
B13	Block 1	1	November 19, 2024	Starship flight test 6	—N/a	Success (OLP-1)	^{Controlled (gulf)} _{Abort (OLP‑1)}	Expended
B14	Block 2	2	January 16, 2025	Starship flight test 7	—N/a	Failure (OLP-1) (Note: The first-stage booster performed nominally, but a failure occurred on the second stage.)	Success (OLP-1)	Destroyed
B14	Block 2	2	May 27, 2025	Starship flight test 9	131 days	Failure (OLP-1)	Failure (gulf)	Destroyed
B15	Block 2	2	March 6, 2025	Starship flight test 8	—N/a	Failure (OLP-1)	Success (OLP-1)	Expended
B15	Block 2	2	October 13, 2025	Starship flight test 11	221 days	Success (OLP-1)	Controlled (gulf)	Expended
B16	Block 2	1	August 26, 2025	Starship flight test 10	—N/a	Success (OLP-1)	Controlled (gulf)	Expended
B17	Block 2	0	—N/a	—	—N/a	—N/a	—N/a	Scrapped
B18	Block 3	0	—N/a	—	—N/a	—N/a	—N/a	Destroyed
B19	Block 3	1	May 22, 2026	Starship flight test 12	—N/a	Success (OLP-2)	Failure (gulf)	Destroyed
B20	Block 3	1	July 24, 2026	Starship flight test 13	—N/a	Success (OLP-2)	Failure (gulf)	Destroyed
B21	Block 3	1	September 28, 2026	Starship flight 14	—N/a	Success (OLP-2)	Controlled (gulf)	Expended
B22	Block 3	1	November 13, 2026	Starship flight 15	—N/a	Success (OLP-2)	^{Controlled (gulf)} _{Abort (OLP‑2)}	Expended
B23	Block 3	0	—N/a	—	—N/a	—N/a	—N/a	Awaiting Cryo Testing at Massey's
B24	Block 3	0	—N/a	—	—N/a	—N/a	—N/a	Under construction
B25	Block 3	0	—N/a	—	—N/a	—N/a	—N/a	Under construction

=== Ground testing (BN1–B6) ===
==== BN1 ====
BN1 was the first Super-Heavy Booster prototype, a pathfinder that was not intended for flight tests. Sections of the ~66 m (217 ft) tall test article were manufactured throughout autumn 2020. Section stacking began in December 2020. BN1 was fully stacked inside the High Bay on March 18, 2021, and was scrapped on March 30, 2021.

==== B3 ====
Booster 3 completed stacking in the High Bay on June 29, 2021, and moved to the test stand. A cryogenic proof test was completed on July 13, followed by a static fire test on July 19. BN3/Booster 3 was partially scrapped on August 15, while the liquid oxygen (LOX) tank remained welded to the Test Stand until January 13, 2022.

==== B4–B5 ====
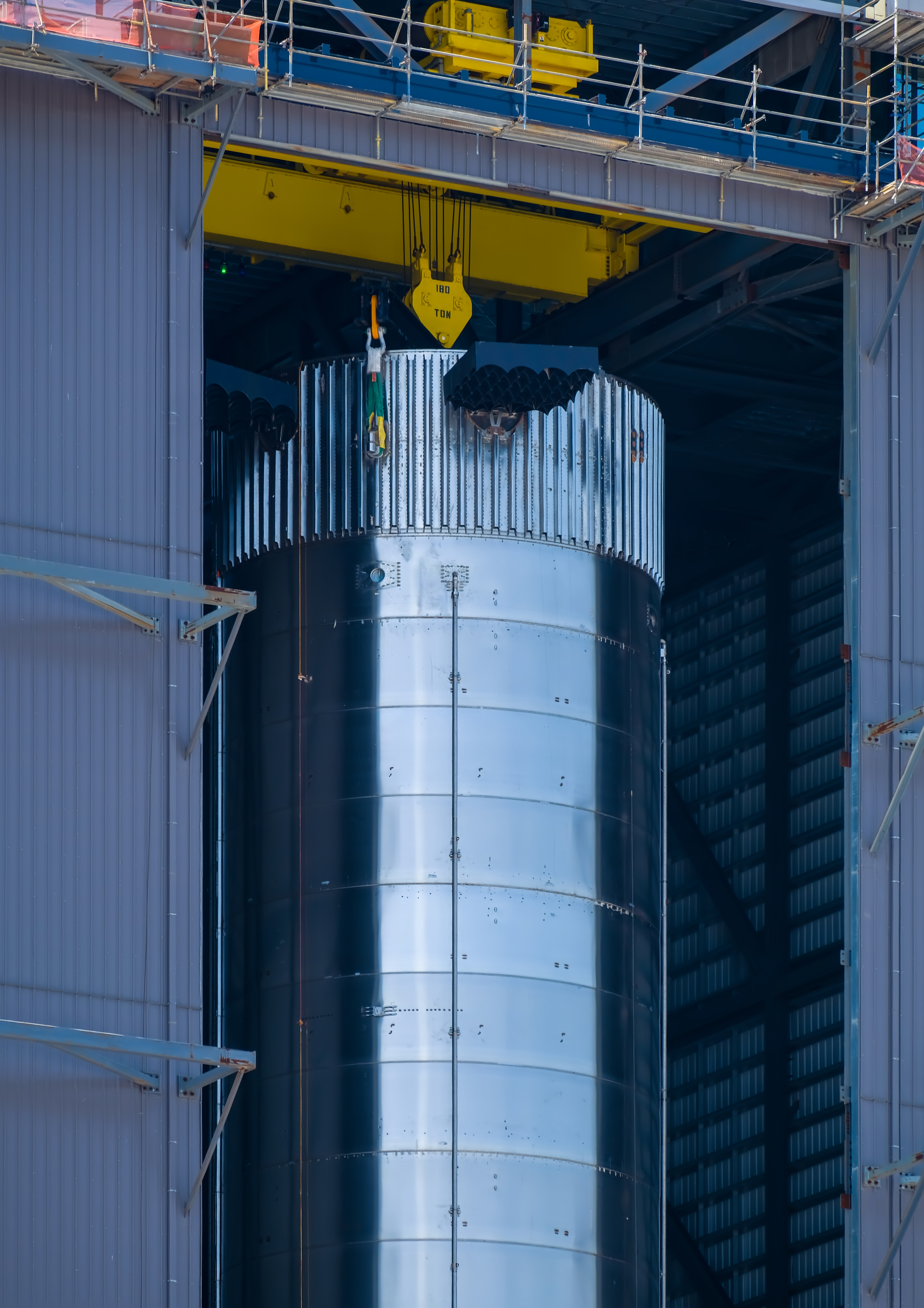
Booster 4 in the High Bay

B4 was fully stacked on August 1, with all 29 engines installed on August 2, 2021. Grid fins were added to support atmospheric reentry testing. S20 was stacked on top of Booster 4 on August 6, 2021 for a fitting test, making it, for two years, the tallest rocket ever fully integrated. B4 completed its first cryogenic proof test on December 17, 2021, followed by a pneumatic proof test, another cryogenic proof test and a full-load cryogenic proof test. B4 and Ship 20 were then retired. On March 6, 2024, B4s grid fins were removed, it was moved to the Mega Bay on March 21 where it was scrapped the following day.

Parts for B5 were observed as early as July 19, 2021. Stacking for B5 completed in November, although on December 8, B5 was retired alongside SN15 and SN16. It was later scrapped.

=== Block 1 launches (B7–B13) ===
==== B7–B8 ====
B7 was placed on the orbital launch mount on March 31, 2022, and completed two cryogenic proof tests in April, resulting in the rupturing of the downcomer. After being repaired, it was returned to OLP-1, and completed two cryogenic tests. It was then moved to Mega Bay 1 for engine and grid fin installation. On July 11, after returning to OLP-1 for engine testing, B7 experienced a detonation underneath the engines during an attempted 33-engine spin prime test. It returned to OLP-1 on August 4 with only the 20 outer Raptor engines, and completed its first single-engine static fire test on August 9, followed by a second two days later. After receiving its thirteen inner engines, B7 conducted a series of spin prime and static fire tests throughout August and September, before again returning to the Mega Bay on September 21. After receiving additional upgrades it was lifted on the launch pad on October 8. Ship 24 was stacked on top B7 on October 12, and was removed after completing multiple cryogenic load tests. B7 then completed a spin prime test of multiple engines on November 12, a 14-engine static fire test on November 14, and finally an 11-engine static fire in an autogenous pressurization test on November 29. In January 2023, Booster 7 and Ship 24 conducted a wet dress rehearsal, before attempting a 33-engine static fire on February 9. On April 20, 2023, Booster 7 was launched on Integrated Flight Test 1, being destroyed before stage separation after a fire in the aft section severed connections between its engines and flight computers, resulting in a loss of attitude control and FTS activation.

B8 was fully stacked on July 8, 2022. It was moved to the launch site on September 19, 2022, though it was not tested there. Booster 8 was scrapped in January 2023 in favor of Booster 9. Booster 8's hydraulic power units were used to replace Booster 7's, along with several other parts, including the engine shielding.

==== B9–B13 ====
B9 finished stacking in late 2022, and featured upgrades, including electric thrust vector control (ETVC) gimbaling system of the raptor engines, replacing the previous hydraulic power units that were used up to Booster 8. It was moved to the OLS cryogenic station on December 15. Two cryogenic proof tests were conducted on December 21 and December 29, both of which were successful. After engine installation, Booster 9 was rolled to OLP-1 on July 20, conducting a cryogenic proof test on OLP-1, followed by a spin prime test on August 4. On August 6, Booster 9 fired 29 engines for 2.7 seconds, instead of the planned 33 engines for five seconds. It was then moved off of OLP-1 and rolled back to Mega Bay 1, where its vented interstage was added on August 16. B9 was moved back to OLP-1 on August 22 and underwent another spin prime test the next day. On August 25, Booster 9 underwent a static fire of all 33 engines, with two engines shutting off early. Ship 25 (S25) was lifted onto B9 for the first time on September 5, and was destacked several times throughout the rest of the month and mid October. On October 22, B9 underwent two partial cryogenic tests, while S25 was not tested, followed by a full wet dress rehearsal (WDR) two days later. On November 18, Booster 9 and Ship 25 lifted off with all 33 engines lit at 7:02 am CST. Following the successful separation from S25, B9 was destroyed after several engine failures during the boost-back burn.

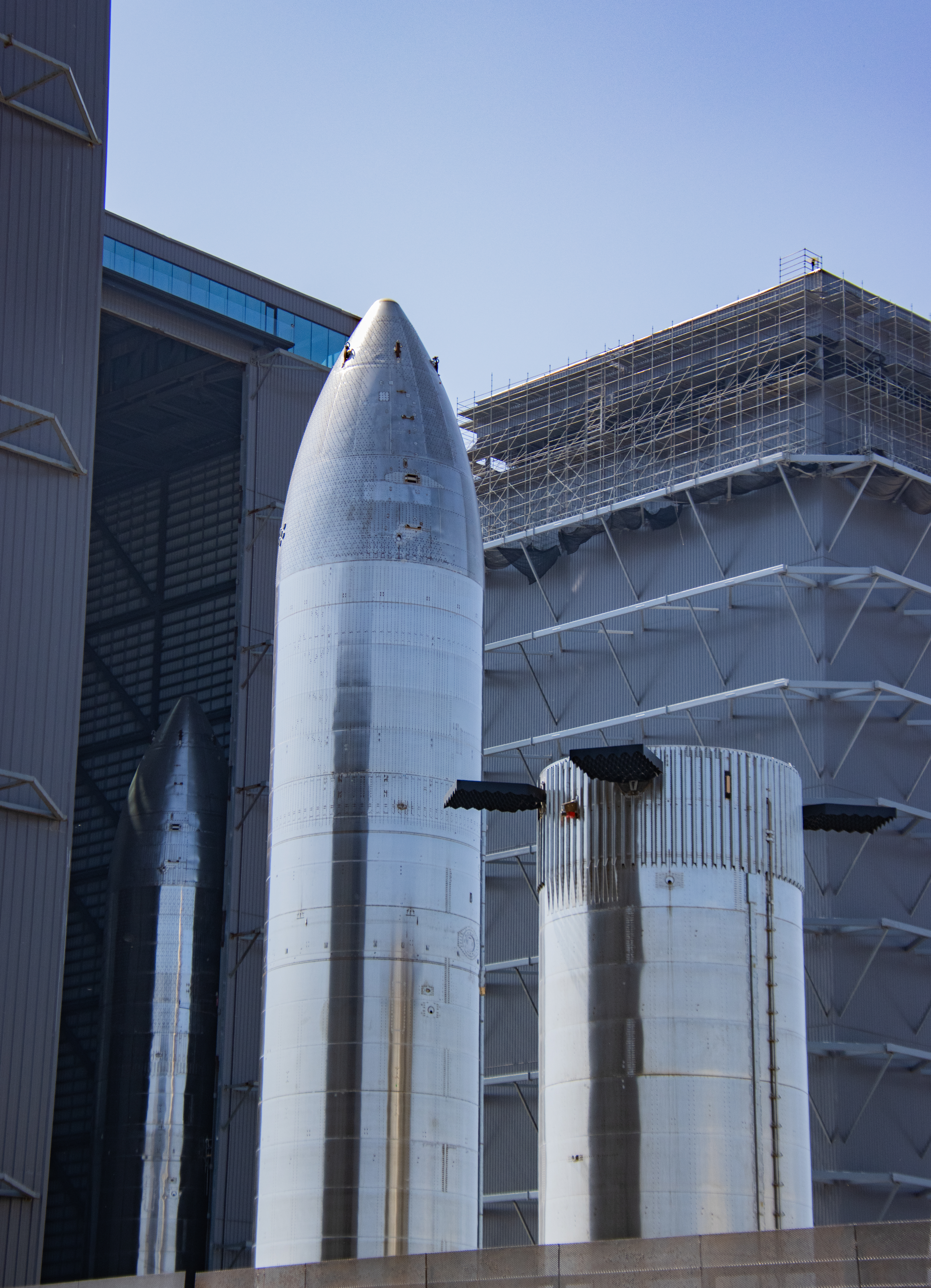
Grid fins and stringers on Booster 10's methane tank (right, foreground), March 12, 2023

B10 was fully stacked in March 2023. B10 was moved to Massey's test site for cryogenic testing on July 7, undergoing a cryogenic proof test on July 18. Additional cryogenic tests were performed in mid September. B10 was moved back to Mega Bay 1 on September 19 for engine and interstage installation. On December 18, B10 was moved to the orbital launch site, followed by a lift onto OLP-1 the next day. It completed a 33-engine static fire test on December 29. On January 2, 2024, B10 was moved back to the Production Site, and was transported to the Orbital Launch Site for a WDR. On February 9, B10 was lifted onto OLP-1, and on February 10, Ship 28 (S28) was lifted onto B10, with the combined vehicle aborting two wet dress rehearsal attempts. The wet dress rehearsal was completed on March 3. The vehicles were destacked for FTS arming on March 5, which occurred on March 8, followed by S28 being restacked on March 10. On March 14, B10 was launched with S28 on IFT-3, completing the ascent burn with zero engine failures. Six engines failed during the boostback burn. During its landing burn, only three engines started up with two failing shortly thereafter.

B11 was fully stacked in June 2023. On October 12, B11 was moved to Massey's test site, where it was cryo-tested on October 14 and October 18. On November 19, B11 was moved back to Mega Bay 1 for engine and interstage installation. B11 was moved to OLP-1 for static-fire testing on April 4, where it conducted a 33-engine static-fire on April 5. On April 7, it was removed from OLP-1, and rolled back to Mega Bay 1 for preflight modifications. On May 10, B11 was rolled out of Mega Bay 1, and rolled to the Orbital Launch Site. It was lifted onto OLP-1 on May 11. On May 15, Ship 29 (S29) was lifted onto B11, with the combined vehicle completing a partial cryogenic test on May 16, and a full wet dress rehearsal on May 20, A second wet dress rehearsal was completed on May 28. On May 29, S29 was destacked for final tile work and Flight Termination System (FTS) Installation, with FTS installation occurring on May 30. S29 was stacked onto B11 for the final time on June 5. On June 6, B11 and S29 launched on IFT-4, with a single engine failure occurring shortly after liftoff. The boostback burn saw no engine failures, though a second engine failed during the landing burn. B11 was destroyed after tipping over, with several components being recovered in late September. On October 9, Vice President of Build and Flight Reliability of SpaceX, Bill Gerstenmaier, claimed that B11 landed within "half a centimeter" of the target.

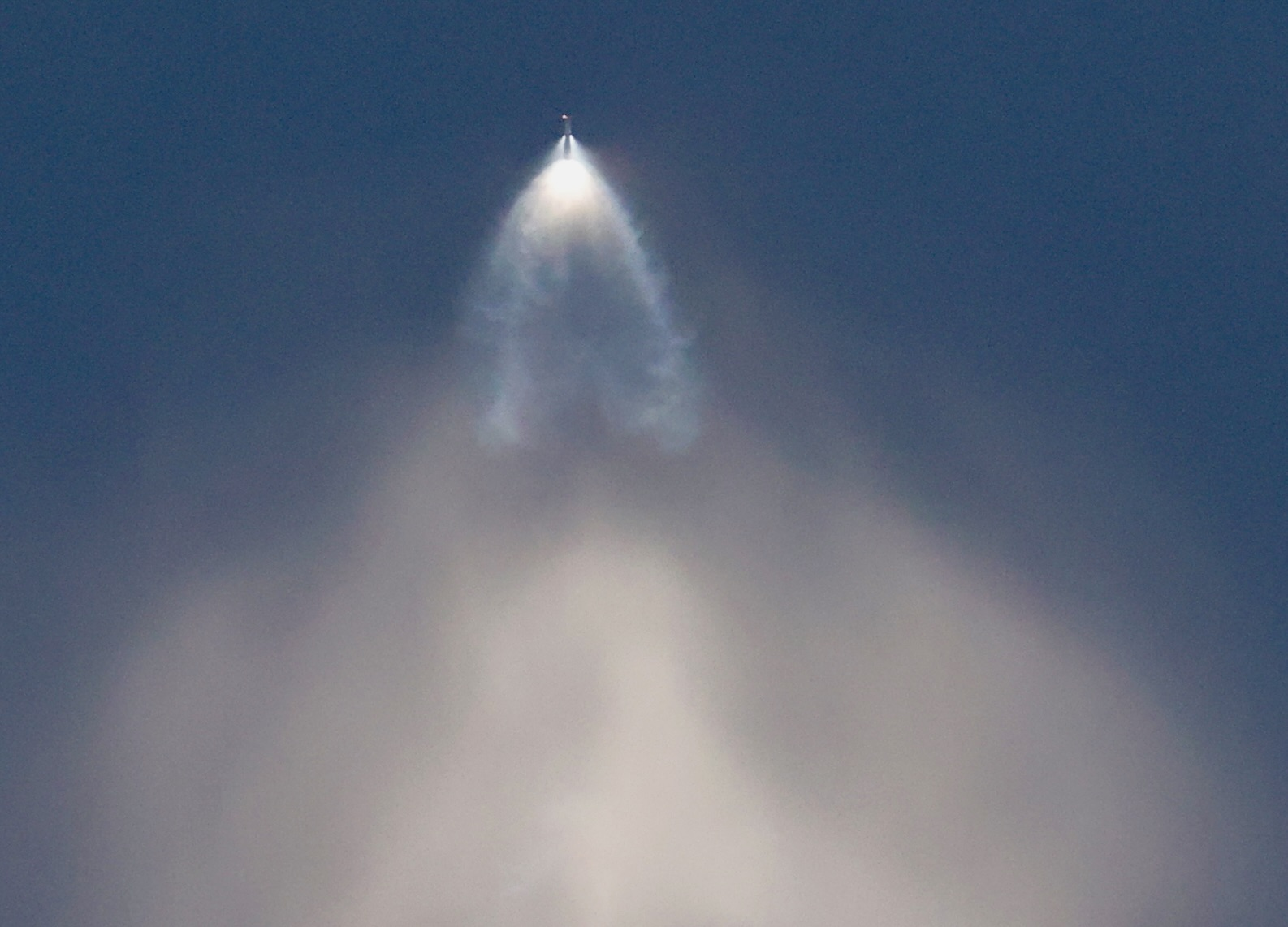
Booster 12 coasting back to the launch site after separating from Ship 30 during IFT-5

B12 began assembly in June 2023. On December 28, 2023, B12 was moved to Massey's for cryogenic testing, where it conducted two cryogenic tests on January 10 and January 12. B12 was moved production site in mid-January for engine installation. B12 was moved to OLP-1 on July 9 for static fire testing, where it conducted a pressurization test on July 11, followed by a 33-engine spin prime on July 12 and a 33-engine static fire on July 15. B12 was rolled back to the production site on July 16, 2024. SpaceX claimed that B12 and S30 were ready to fly on August 8. On September 20, B12 was rolled to the launch site, with S30 being lifted onto B12 the next day. A partial wet dress rehearsal was conducted on September 23. A second partial wet dress rehearsal occurred on October 7, followed by S30 being destacked for FTS installation. FTS was installed on both vehicles on October 9, and S30 was stacked onto B12 for Flight 5 on October 11. B12 and S30 launched on October 13, with B12 successfully conducting the ascent, boostback, and landing burns with no engine failures, before being caught by the tower's chopsticks, and lowered onto OLP-1. Musk claimed that B12 suffered damage that could be "easily addressed", including warping of the outer engine nozzles. B12's FTS was removed on October 14, followed by being returned to Mega Bay 1 for post-flight inspections. On October 22, B12's vented interstage was recovered, followed by B12 retirement to the rocket garden on October 28.

B13 and subsequent vehicles have upgraded liquid oxygen vents, a new raceway design, and reinforced chines. B13's assembly was completed on February 3, 2024. It was rolled to Massey's test site for cryogenic testing on April 25. B13 completed its first cryo-test on April 26, and a second cryogenic test on April 29. On October 22, B13 was rolled to OLP-1, where a partial cryogenic test was performed two days later. Following this, B13 conducted a static fire, and was subsequently rolled to Mega Bay 1. It returned to the launch site for IFT-6 on November 14, where Ship 31 (S31) was lifted onto the booster. FTS was installed on November 15, followed by a partial wet dress rehearsal on November 17. On November 19, B13 launched with S31, completing the ascent, boostback, and landing burns. However, the "catch" attempt was called off due to an issue with the launch tower, and the booster was diverted to splashdown in the Gulf of Mexico. B13's aft section was recovered in late July, 2025.

=== Block 2 launches (B14–B17) ===
On May 11, 2024, SpaceX released an image showing that B14 had been assembled. B14 was rolled out of Mega Bay 1 on October 2, ahead of a rollout to Massey's the next day. On October 4, B14 conducted its first cryogenic test, followed by a second on October 5. It was then moved to Mega Bay 1 on October 7. After receiving its thirty-three engines, B14 was moved to OLP-1 for static-fire testing on December 5. It conducted a spin prime test on December 7, followed by a static fire on December 9. B14 then rolled back to Mega Bay 1 for final preflight modifications. On December 30, it returned to OLP A for launch. Musk confirmed on January 2 that B14 would be reflying an engine from B12. On January 3, FTS was installed on the booster. On January 9, Ship 33 (S33) was stacked onto the booster, surpassing Starship Block 1 as the tallest rocket ever assembled. The combined vehicle conducted a Wet Dress Rehearsal on January 10, before being destacked on the 11th. Ship 33 was restacked the next day. On January 16, B14 launched with S33, conducting a nominal ascent burn, and successfully separated from the upper stage. Despite a failure to relight an engine for the boostback burn, B14 returned to the launch site, and was caught after igniting all thirteen engines for the landing burn. On January 18, it was rolled to the rocket garden.

B14-2 returned to the launch site on April 1, 2025, and conducted a static fire there on April 3, becoming the first recovered Super Heavy booster to static fire after launch. It returned to the production site on April 8. On April 18, B14-2 received its second vented interstage in MB1. It was rolled to Pad-1 on May 13, only to be rolled back to the production site on May 17. On May 24, B14-2 was rolled to Pad-1 for launch, with S35 being integrated with B14 on May 25. B14-2 and S35 launched on May 27, with B14-1 keeping all 33 engines lit until MECO. Unlike its first flight, it ignited all 13 gimbaling engines for the boostback burn. After descending through the atmosphere, it ignited 12 engines for the landing burn, before detonating over the Gulf of Mexico.

B15 features upgraded electrical systems, such as a more powerful processor and "integrated smart-batteries". On July 23, 2024, B15's aft section was spotted, featuring additional tanks attached to the liquid oxygen header tank. On December 21, it was moved to Massey's for cryogenic testing. It completed a cryogenic test on December 27, followed by additional tests on December 28. Following this, it returned to Mega Bay 1 for engine and grid-fin installation. On February 8, B15 rolled to OLP-1, where it conducted a static fire on February 9. Following this test, it returned to Mega Bay 1. On February 25, B15 rolled to the launch site, where on March 2, Ship 34 (S34) was stacked onto the booster for launch. A launch attempt was aborted late into the count on March 3. S34 was destacked on March 4, and restacked on March 5 after an aborted attempt earlier that day. On March 6, B15 launched with S34, completing its ascent burn before separating from the upper stage. Following this, it returned to the launch site, and was caught.

B15-2 returned to Mega Bay 1 on March 8, before moving to the Rocket Garden on March 19. On September 6, 2025, B15-2 was rolled to the launch site for its second static fire test, conducted for a full duration on September 7. The booster was then returned to the mega bay for vented interstage installation and final preflight preparations. It was rolled to Pad-1 for its second and final flight on October 8, 2025. S38 would be lifted onto the booster on October 11.

On October 14, 2024, the first section for B16 was spotted being moved around Starfactory. Stacking began in late October, and concluded in late December. It conducted a cryogenic test on February 28, followed by a return to Mega Bay 1 in late March. It rolled out for static fire testing on June 4, with a static fire attempt being aborted on June 5. The test was completed on June 6. After this, the booster rolled back into Mega Bay 1 on June 8. Its vented interstage was installed on June 16, 2025. However, this was removed following the catastrophic failure of Ship 36's six engine static fire. On August 23, following rollout to the launch site, Ship 37 was stacked onto B16 for Flight 10. The first launch attempt was aborted about ten minutes into propellant load, with a second attempt being scrubbed forty seconds before the targeted launch time. A third attempt on August 26 was successful, despite B16 losing an engine during the ascent burn. B16 managed to complete the landing burn experiment previously scheduled for the flight before, splashing down in the Gulf of Mexico about seven minutes after liftoff.

Assembly of B17 began on January 4, 2025. It was rolled to Massey's on April 8, where it conducted its cryogenic proof tests. After these tests were completed, B17 returned to Mega Bay 1 briefly, before rolling to the rocket garden. B17 was scrapped on November 20, 2025.

=== Block 3 launches (B18–subsequent) ===
Block 3 boosters have an integrated vented interstage/forward dome, three grid fins instead of the prior four, as well as Raptor 3 engines. The switch to Raptor 3 enables the removal of the majority of the booster's engine shielding.

Assembly of B18 begun on May 19, 2025., with the stacking of vehicle sections continuing into November. It rolled to Massey's for cryogenic testing on November 20, 2025. B18 then experienced an anomaly during its initial testing at Massey's on November 21, and was scrapped days later.

B19 began stacking on November 27, 2025, with it being fully stacked on December 24. It is expected to be used in Flight 12, the flight that B18 was originally intended for. Booster 19 rolled to Massey's for cryogenic testing on February 1, 2026. This testing occurred shortly after arriving at Massey's. The booster returned to Mega Bay 1 on February 9 for engine installation. On March 8, it was rolled out to the launch site for static fire testing. Another cryogenic test was completed on March 10, with this being the first loading of propellant on Pad-2. Following this on March 11 was a Spin Prime, and an igniter test on March 15. A ten engine static fire test occurred on March 16, though an issue with the launch pad caused an early shutdown. Booster 19 returned to the production site on March 18 for installation of the remaining twenty three engines. On April 11, it returned to the launch site with all thirty three engines, where it underwent either a cryogenic test or spin prime on April 12. An igniter test was performed on April 13, and a 33-engine static fire on April 15. Following rollout to the launch site on May 6, a third static fire was completed. Following stacking with Ship 39 (S39), it had an aborted wet dress rehearshal on May 9. The test was completed successfully on May 11. It launched on May 22, after an aborted launch attempt the previous day, with a mostly successful ascent burn. However, after stage separation, nearly all of the engines failed on the boostback burn, forcing an early abort. The landing burn had even fewer successful ignitions, and the booster crashed into the Gulf of Mexico.

B20, following completion of its stacking, was rolled out to Massey's for cryogenic testing on June 5, 2026, where it completed a cryogenic test on June 6. On July 10, it conducted a thirty-three engine static fire, which lasted for the intended duration, following a rollout to the launch site the day before.

== Test articles ==
=== Super Heavy-based test articles ===
S/N	Tests	Decommission Date	Status
BN2.1	2	June 25, 2021	Retired
B2.1	3	December 6, 2022	Retired
B6.1	1	May 2023	Destroyed
B7.1	6	December 2022	Scrapped
HSLH	2	October 2023	Scrapped
B14.1	3+	August 2024	Scrapped
Block 3 Header Tank Test Article	1+	—N/a	Active
B18.1	16	—N/a	Active
B18.3	10	—N/a	Active

BN2.1 was rolled out on June 3, 2021 for cryogenic tests. It conducted two tests, the first on June 8, 2021, and the second on June 17, 2021.

B2.1 (not BN2.1) conducted three cryogenic tests on December 1, 2021, December 2, 2021, and December 3, 2021.

B6.1 was originally intended to be the third flight-worthy Super Heavy, but was repurposed as a test tank. In May 2023, it was used to test the modified FTS system, after the FTS on B7 and S24 failed to destroy the vehicle.

B7.1 was first cryogenically proof tested on 28 June 2022, and tested again on 19 July 2022. During a suspected pressurize to failure test two days later, it received minor damage. B7.1 was then moved to the Massey's test site in September 2022, and then scrapped in December 2023.

Hot Stage Load Head (HSLH) was a test article designed to verify the structural integrity of the interstage of Super Heavy Boosters 9+. It was transported to the Massey's test site on July 30, 2023, before being loaded onto the Can Crusher testing device. In mid-October 2023, it was moved back to the production site, where it was disassembled.

B14.1 is a test article consisting of a booster common dome and a forward section. After structural testing at Massey's, it was moved to the launch site on June 21, 2024, and lifted onto OLP-1. It was tested on June 26, followed by additional testing on June 27. It conducted additional testing on August 15. On August 17, it was returned to the production site, where it was scrapped on January 11, 2025.

The Block 3 Header Tank Test Article was a Block 3 booster header tank tested at McGregor in 2025.

B18.1 is a test article of the Block 3 aft section, including a Block 3 booster header tank. It was rolled to Massey's for testing on May 10, 2025. On September 19, 2025, it was damaged during a cryogenic test.

B18.3 is a test article for the Block 3 forward section/vented interstage assembly. It was destroyed in January 2026 during a test at Massey's.

=== General test articles ===
Serial number	Tests	Decommission Date	Status
TT1	1	January 10, 2020	Destroyed
TT2	2	January 29, 2020	Destroyed
GSE 4.1	2	January 18, 2022	Destroyed
EDOME	2	Late October 2022	Destroyed
EDOME2	1	December 2023	Scrapped

Test Tank 1 (TT1) was a subscale test tank consisting of two forward bulkheads connected by a small barrel section. TT1 was used to test new materials and construction methods. On January 10, 2020, TT1 was tested to failure as part of an ambient temperature test, reaching a pressure of 7.1 bar (103 psi).

Test Tank 2 (TT2) was another subscale test tank similar to TT1. On January 27, 2020, TT2 underwent an ambient temperature pressure test where it reached a pressure of 7.5 bar (109 psi) before a leak occurred. Two days later, it underwent a cryogenic proof test to destruction, bursting at 8.5 bar (123 psi).

GSE 4.1 was first spotted in August 2021 and was the first ground support equipment (GSE) test tank built, made from parts of GSE 4. It underwent a cryogenic proof test in August 2021 before it was rolled to the Sanchez site. It was rolled back to the launch site in November 2021, where it underwent an apparent cryogenic proof test to failure on January 18, 2022, when it burst at an unknown pressure.

EDOME was a test tank created to test flatter domes, possibly used on future Starship prototypes. It was moved to the launch site in July 2022, and then back to the production site the next month, after undergoing no tests. It was later moved from the production site to the Massey's test site in late September 2022, where it was damaged during a cryogenic pressure test to failure. After repairs, it was tested to destruction in late October 2022.

EDOME 2 was a test tank which was likely designed to continue testing a flatter dome design. As of October 4, 2023, its official designation is unknown. It was tested once, before being scrapped for unknown reasons.

== See also ==
- List of Falcon 9 first-stage boosters
- Starship HLS, lunar variant of the Starship spacecraft
- SpaceX Starbase, launch site of Super Heavy
- Starlink, large satellite constellation by SpaceX
- List of Starship vehicles
- List of Starship launches
