= Starship Propellant Transfer Demonstration =

First propellant transfer between Starships

- Mission type: Flight test
- Operator: SpaceX

Spacecraft properties
- Spacecraft type: Starship
- Manufacturer: SpaceX

Start of mission
- Launch date: NET Q1 2027
- Rocket: Super Heavy
- Launch site: Starbase, OLP-A or OLP-B
- Deployed from: Starbase, Texas

End of mission
- Landing site: Starbase, Texas

Orbital parameters
- Regime: Low Earth orbit

Payload
- Liquid Methane (CH4), Liquid Oxygen (LOX)

The SpaceX Starship Propellant Transfer Demo is a planned demonstration of essential capabilities required for refueling a Starship in low-Earth orbit. A somewhat similar test occurred during the Starship flight test 3, though the transfer during that test was between two tanks on the same vehicle. The ability to refuel a Starship in low orbit is critical for the NASA Artemis program, as Starship HLS (Human Landing System) requires approximately ten tanker launches of propellant to a depot in orbit to refuel a Starship sufficiently to then reach the lunar surface.

It was planned for March 2025 but it is not yet scheduled.

== Research and development ==
Starship test flights since about 2024 have had goals that support research and development of a future Artemis lunar landing. During those Starship test flights, engineers were expected to "measure the slosh of propellants inside the ship, along with tank pressures, and observe how the fluids respond to impulses from small thrusters". These small rocket jets guide the ship's liquid toward the refueling outflow.

Additionally, by monitoring boil-off rates of fuel while in space, SpaceX and NASA officials will determine the rate of the propellant lost and better understand how many refueling tankers they need to launch to a propellant depot ship prior to a Starship assisted lunar landing mission.

In 2024, an article in the journal npj Microgravity documented the many issues that would need addressing related to in-orbit propellant storage and transfer.

== Mission profile ==
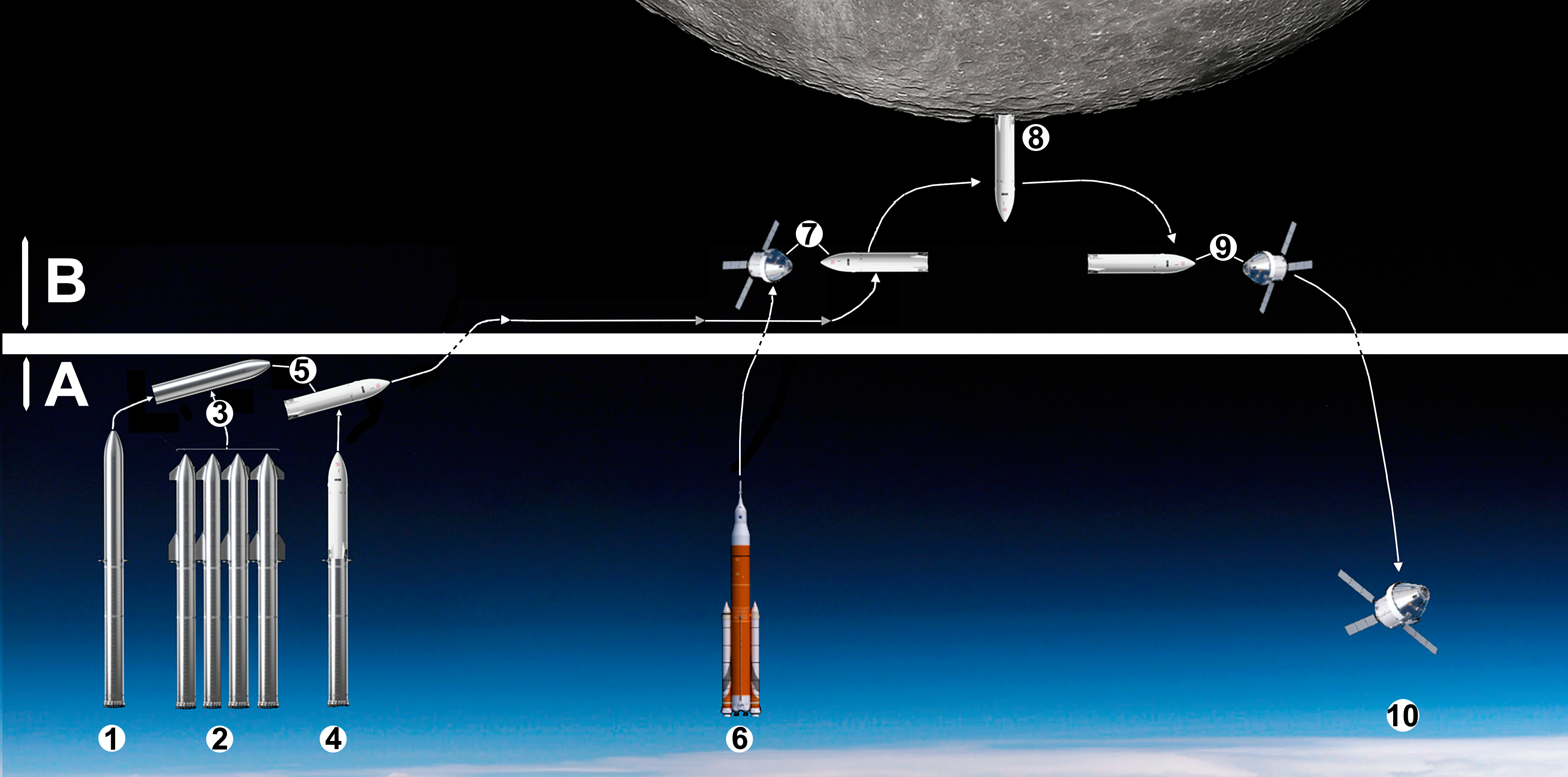
Plan for propellant tankers and propellant depot in the Artemis 4 mission: A Low Earth orbit – B Near-rectilinear halo lunar orbit – 1 Launch of the Starship propellant depot – 2 Launch Starship tanker (≥10) – 3 Ship-to-ship propellant transfer between Starship tanker and Starship propellant depot (≥10) – 4 Launch of Starship HLS – 5 Ship-to-ship propellant transfer between propellant depot and Starship HLS – 6 Orion launch with crew – 7 Crew transfer from Orion to Starship HLS – 8 Starship HLS stays on the Moon – 9 Crew transfer from Starship HLS to Orion – 10 Crew return to Earth.

The Starship Propellant Transfer Demo will begin with the first launch. This launch will deliver the upper stage (the propellant depot) into orbit around the Earth, while the first stage returns to the launch site for a catch by the launch tower. The propellant depot is expected to have a power system with more battery capacity to remain in space longer than usual for Starships and thermal insulation and vacuum jacketing to limit boil-off of propellant. The second launch will repeat this profile three to four weeks later, with a "tanker" second upper stage that will dock with the first Starship (the propellant depot). Once docked, the vehicles will use a pressure differential between them to force propellant from the second vehicle into the first. After this is complete, the two ships will undock, the tanker will reenter the Earth's atmosphere and be caught by the launch tower, while the propellant depot will remain in orbit.

=== Payload ===
The second launch in the propellant transfer will fly an unknown amount of propellant as its payload. To prevent the propellant from boiling during the vehicle's time in orbit, significant insulation and vacuum jacketing will be added to the propellant lines inside the vehicle. This change was introduced on the first Starship Block 2 vehicle, S33.

The manager of NASA's lunar landing program, said in 2024 that, “We’re going to have to do the [autonomous] prop transfer flights more than once or twice or three times in my opinion” [before proceeding with a manned Artemis flight].

== Delayed Launch ==
The in-orbit Starship Propellant Transfer Demonstration was originally planned for March 2025, then delayed to March 2026, but it is not yet scheduled as of September 2026.
