= Boskalis Forte =

Semi-submersible heavy-lift ship

Boskalis Forte is a semi-submersible heavy-transport ship owned and operated by the Dutch company Boskalis. The ship is 216.7 m (711 ft) long with a 43 m (141 ft) hull width.

== History ==
Originally built as Dockwise Forte, the ship was acquired in 2013 when Boskalis acquired Dockwise, and was renamed in 2018 as Boskalis Forte.

The ship was contracted by SpaceX in August 2026 to transport the 52-meter long Starship Ship 40 from the Indian Ocean back to Port of Brownsville in Texas. Ship 40 unexpectedly remained intact on the ocean surface after a flight to space then a controlled reentry and zero-velocity splashdown northwest of Australia during a flight test on 24 July 2026, and SpaceX subsequently decided to salvage the spaceship and bring it back to Starbase, Texas, for engineering analysis. After 33 days at sea following the test flight, Ship 40 was loaded onto Forte on 26 August in the Christmas Island anchorage for the 17,000 km (11,000 mi) voyage to the U.S.
