= Starship flight 14 =

First operational flight of the SpaceX Starship

- Names: Starlink Group 31-1
- Mission type: Starlink deployment
- Operator: SpaceX
- Website: https://www.spacex.com/launches/starship-flight-14

Spacecraft properties
- Spacecraft: Starship Ship 41
- Spacecraft type: Starship (Block 3)
- Manufacturer: SpaceX

Start of mission
- Launch date: September 28, 2026, 12:48:59 UTC (7:48:59 CDT)
- Rocket: Super Heavy (Block 3, B21)
- Launch site: Starbase, OLP-2

End of mission
- Landing date: September 28, 2026, 12:56:00 UTC (7:56:00 CDT) (Super Heavy)
- Landing site: Super Heavy: Gulf of Mexico; Starship: Pacific Ocean

Orbital parameters
- Reference system: Geocentric orbit
- Regime: Low Earth orbit
- Perigee altitude: 262 km (163 mi)
- Apogee altitude: 275 km (171 mi)
- Inclination: 30.5°

Payload
- 26 Starlink V3 satellites, including 3 equipped with cameras

Starship flight 14 was the fourteenth launch and the first operational flight of the SpaceX Starship launch system. Building on the preceding flight-test campaign, the mission marked a significant expansion of Starship's objectives, successfully entering a sustained low Earth orbit trajectory and completing the first operational Starlink deployment.

The flight marked the first time a Starship spacecraft entered sustained Earth orbit and deployed functional payloads. The mission was a landmark step in the program's development and in demonstrating the spacecraft's potential for carrying cargo and, eventually, human passengers.

Flight 14 also set several milestones for the Starship program, including the longest-duration Starship flight to date and the first time the launch system reached orbit. The mission deployed 26 operational Starlink V3 satellites. Each V3 satellite was designed to provide substantially greater network capacity than earlier V2-generation satellites.

== Background ==
Before Flight 14, all 13 previous full-scale Starship flights had followed suborbital trajectories. Flight 14 was planned as the program's first flight to enter low Earth orbit, and its first deployment of operational satellites. The original mission profile called for Ship 41 to perform an orbital-insertion burn approximately 25 minutes after liftoff, deploy 26 Starlink V3 satellites, and complete approximately six orbits during a flight lasting nearly 10 hours before deorbiting over the Pacific Ocean west of Chile.

=== Development approach ===
Starship has developed through an iterative design process in which successive vehicles are built and flown in relatively rapid succession, with flight data and hardware performance used to inform subsequent designs. The approach allows changes to propulsion, structures, thermal protection, flight software and operational procedures to be tested during full-scale flights.

Flight 14 refers to the number of times the complete Starship–Super Heavy system has flown since testing began in April 2023. Earlier vehicles had experienced a mixture of successful demonstrations, partial mission completions and vehicle losses while SpaceX progressively expanded the system's capabilities.

Rapid reusability is a central objective of the program because reusable launch vehicles can potentially reduce both launch costs and turnaround times. The Times reported that Starship was designed with substantially greater payload capacity than Falcon 9, which remained SpaceX's primary operational orbital launch vehicle during Starship's development. The deployment of the first 26 operational V3 satellites on Flight 14 represented an initial demonstration of this role.

== Mission profile ==
Flight 14 lifted off from Starbase, Texas, at 12:48:59 UTC on September 28, 2026. During the initial ascent, one of the 33 Raptor engines on Super Heavy shut down prematurely. The booster continued its ascent, separated from Ship 41 during hot-staging, and subsequently performed its boostback and landing sequence. Super Heavy completed a controlled splashdown in the Gulf of Mexico approximately seven minutes after liftoff.

During Ship 41's ascent, one of its three Raptor Vacuum engines shut down prematurely. SpaceX initially announced that the spacecraft would not commit to orbit, but reversed that decision after evaluating its condition. Approximately 25 minutes after liftoff, Ship 41 performed a short orbital-insertion burn using a single Raptor engine and entered Earth orbit.

Ship 41 began deploying 26 operational Starlink V3 satellites approximately 34 minutes after liftoff. The deployment sequence lasted about 30 minutes, and all 26 satellites were released into orbit. Three satellites carried additional cameras intended to image Ship 41's heat shield while the spacecraft was in orbit.

Following the ascent engine problem, SpaceX shortened the flight rather than continuing the original multi-orbit mission profile. Ship 41 performed an early deorbit burn approximately two hours and 12 minutes after launch and subsequently reentered Earth's atmosphere over the Pacific Ocean.

During its final descent, Ship 41 transitioned from horizontal atmospheric flight to a vertical orientation and performed its landing burn. The spacecraft completed a controlled splashdown in the Pacific Ocean north of Hawaii approximately three hours and eight minutes after launch. After splashdown, Ship 41 tipped onto its side and residual propellant ignited. SpaceX had not planned to recover the spacecraft from the ocean.

== Flight timeline ==
The mission was originally scheduled to last nearly ten hours, but the post-deployment portion of the flight was shortened. The following chronology therefore uses approximate mission-elapsed times for major events rather than the original planned timing for the final five orbits.

Time	Event	September 28
−00:50:00	SpaceX flight director conducts poll and verifies GO for propellant load	Success
−00:36:33	Booster LOX (liquid oxygen) load underway	Success
−00:35:00	Booster fuel (liquid methane) load underway	Success
−00:34:13	Ship LOX load underway	Success
−00:34:11	Ship fuel load underway	Success
−00:21:40	Raptor engine chill begins on booster and ship	Success
−00:02:50	Booster propellant load complete	Success
−00:02:10	Ship propellant load complete	Success
−00:00:30	SpaceX flight director verifies GO for launch	Success
−00:00:17	Flame diverter activation	Success
−00:00:03	Booster engine startup command	Success
00:00:00	Liftoff at 2026-09-28 12:48:59 UTC (7:48:59 CDT)	Partial success One engine failed at T+00:01:16.
+00:00:58	Max Q (moment of peak aerodynamic stress on the rocket)	Success
+00:02:20	Super Heavy MECO (most engines cut off)	Success
+00:02:22	Hot-staging (Starship Raptor ignition and stage separation)	Success
+00:02:27	Super Heavy boostback burn start	Partial success 26 of 28 engines relit
+00:03:07	Super Heavy boostback burn shutdown	Success
+00:06:35	Super Heavy landing burn start	Partial success 11 of 13 engines relit
+00:07:01	Super Heavy landing burn shutdown	Success
+00:08:11	Starship engine cutoff	Partial success 1 Raptor Vacuum failed on ascent, causing a temporary abort of the orbital insertion burn
+00:25:28	Starship orbital insertion burn start	Success
+00:25:47	Starship orbital insertion burn shutdown	Success
+00:34:18	Payload deploy start	Success
+01:04:50	Payload deploy complete	Success
-	Early on-orbit contingency check	Not completed due to early de-orbit
-	Late on-orbit contingency check	Not completed due to early de-orbit
+02:12:00	Deorbit burn start	Success
+02:12:11	Deorbit burn shutdown	Success
+02:28:52	Starship entry	Success
+02:47:30	Starship is transonic	Success
+02:48:07	Starship is subsonic	Success
+02:50:11	Landing burn start	Success
+02:50:13	Landing flip	Success
+03:08:20	Landing burn 3 to 2 engines	Success
+03:08:26	Landing burn 2 to 1 engine	Success
+03:08:30	Splashdown	Success
Source: SpaceX

=== Significance ===
Flight 14 marked a transition in Starship's development from primarily suborbital integrated flight testing toward orbital operations. The mission demonstrated orbital insertion, sustained orbital flight and deployment of operational payloads during a single Starship mission. The Times described the flight as Starship's transition from a suborbital test vehicle toward an operational spacecraft capable of sustained orbital missions. The successful orbital insertion also opened a new phase of testing in which SpaceX could evaluate Starship systems over longer-duration flights and under orbital conditions.

SpaceX stated following orbital insertion that reaching orbit allowed the program to begin the next phase of developing Starship toward "fully and rapidly reusable" operations. In the near term, Starship is planned to support missions in Earth orbit and to the Moon. NASA selected SpaceX in 2021 to develop a modified Starship spacecraft as a lunar lander for the Artemis program. The lunar variant, known as the Starship Human Landing System (Starship HLS), is intended to transport astronauts between NASA's Orion spacecraft in lunar orbit and the lunar surface. The architecture requires Starship-derived spacecraft to perform extended operations in space, rendezvous and docking, propellant transfer and lunar landing and ascent operations.

As of Flight 14, NASA planned to return astronauts to the lunar surface through the Artemis program, with Starship HLS intended to serve as one of the program's crewed lunar landing systems. Blue Origin, founded by Jeff Bezos, is separately developing the Blue Moon lunar lander under a NASA contract. The company is also developing its New Glenn heavy-lift launch vehicle, providing another large reusable launch-system architecture under development in the United States.

== See also ==
- Falcon 1 fourth flight
- Falcon 9 flight 20
- SpaceX reusable launch system development program
- Starship HLS
- List of Starship launches
- Starlink
