= Starship flight test 6 =

Sixth launch of SpaceX Starship

Starship Flight Test 6
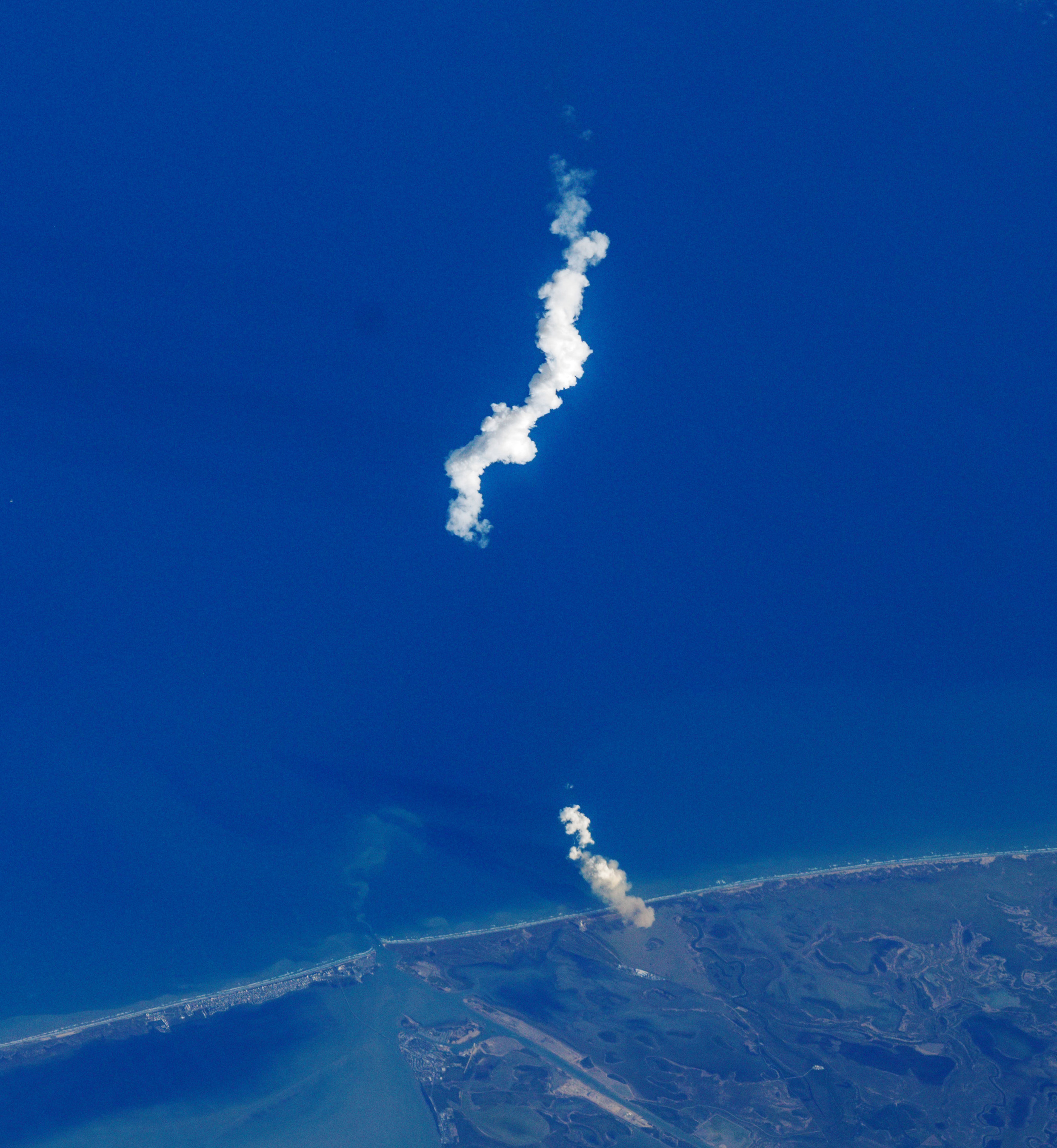
- The plume from Starship flight test 6 as seen from the International Space Station
- Mission type: Flight test
- Operator: SpaceX
- Mission duration: 1 hour, 5 minutes, 24 seconds

Spacecraft properties
- Spacecraft: Starship Ship 31
- Spacecraft type: Starship
- Manufacturer: SpaceX

Start of mission
- Launch date: November 19, 2024, 4:00 pm CST (22:00 UTC)
- Rocket: Super Heavy (B13)
- Launch site: Starbase, OLP-1

End of mission
- Landing date: Super Heavy: November 19, 2024, 4:06:51 pm CST (22:06:51 UTC); Ship: November 19, 2024, 5:05:28 pm CST (23:05:28 UTC)
- Landing site: Super Heavy: Gulf of Mexico (actual) Starbase, OLP-1 (planned); Ship: Indian Ocean

Orbital parameters
- Regime: Transatmospheric Earth orbit
- Perigee altitude: Initial: 8 km (5 mi); After relight: 50 km (31 mi)
- Apogee altitude: Initial: 190 km (120 mi); After relight: 228 km (142 mi)
- Inclination: 26.3°
- Mission patch SpaceX Starship flight tests

Starship flight test 6 was the sixth flight test of a SpaceX Starship launch vehicle. The prototype vehicles flown were the Ship 31 upper stage and first stage Booster 13. The flight test started on November 19, 2024, at 22:00:00 UTC (4:00 pm CST, local time at the launch site).

Although the flight had a similar profile to Flight 5, a suborbital flight to the Indian Ocean, it had several changes to gain flight data for future ship recovery and reuse. The ship reentered the atmosphere at a steeper angle to test the limits of the flaps, and certain parts were outfitted with new thermal protection materials. Certain areas of the heat shield were removed in anticipation of the addition of catch hardware on future ships, which will be needed to land the ship on the arms of the launch tower. Flight 6 was the first flight to include an in-space burn of a single Raptor engine, demonstrating the deorbiting capability of Starship. The launch occurred at a later time of day than previous flights to enable the ship to descend to the ocean in the daylight at the landing location for better visual observations. This was the last flight of the Block 1 Starship upper stage. Block 2 and eventually Block 3 were used for future flights.

== Background ==
=== Vehicle testing ahead of launch ===
Starship Ship 31 (S31) was rolled to Masseys Test Site at SpaceX Starbase in Texas for cryogenic testing on May 11, 2024. During its first cryogenic test on May 12, an electrical anomaly occurred, and Starship Ship 31 was rolled back to the production site for repairs on May 15. S31 completed a successful cryogenic test in early July. S31 completed a successful static fire on September 18. It was rolled to launch site on November 11.

Super Heavy Booster 13 (B13) was moved to the Orbital Launch Pad on October 22, 2024. While on the launch pad it conducted a static fire of all 33 of its Raptor engines on October 24. It was rerolled to the launch site and stacked with S31 on November 14. On November 17 B13 and S31 conducted a partial tanking test ahead of launch.

== Mission profile ==
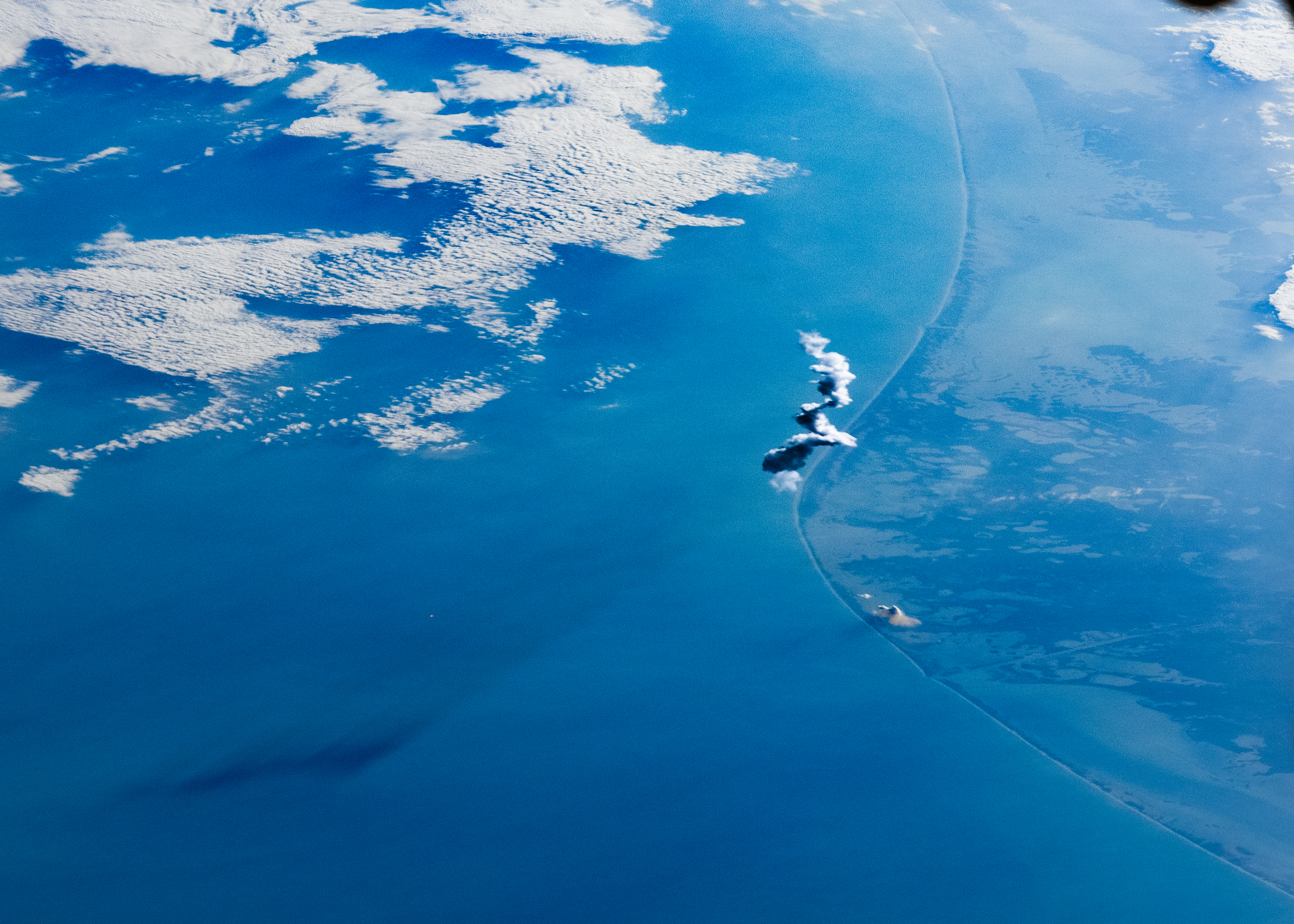
A fiery spot at Booster 13's landing location can be seen center left, above the launch plume's shadow in another capture from the ISS

The mission profile for flight test 6 mirrored the trajectory of flight test 5, with Starship launching on November 19, 2024, at 22:00:00 UTC (4:00 pm CST, local time at the launch site). At T+ 2:39, the Starship upper stage hot-staged from Super Heavy, and continued its ascent. Although Super Heavy was supposed to return to Starbase, the booster catch was called off due to a loss of communication to the launch tower. It was later found that during launch a communications and weather station antenna were bent from the engine plume. Instead, Super Heavy came down for a controlled landing 32 km (20 mi) downrange in the Gulf of Mexico where it soon broke up. Its liquid oxygen tank section continued to float before being sunk the following day.

Shortly after, Ship 31 shut its engines down, entering a coast phase. The upper stage Starship spacecraft reached an initial apogee of 190 km (120 mi) and a perigee of 8 km (5.0 mi) at a 26.3 degree orbit, marking the first time Starship has had positive perigee. At 22:37:46, the Ship successfully conducted the first Raptor engine relight in the vacuum of space, which raised the apogee to 228 km (142 mi) and the perigee to 50 km (31 mi). Starship reentered the atmosphere at 22:47:13, and at 23:05:24, Starship performed a controlled splash down in the Indian Ocean, which marked the first time Starship landed from space during daylight hours.

=== Flight timeline ===
Time	Event	November 19, 2024
−01:15:00	Flight director conducts a poll and verifies go for propellant loading	Go for propellant loading
−00:49:50	Starship fuel (liquid methane) load start	Success
−00:49:21	Starship oxidizer (liquid oxygen) load start	Success
−00:41:15	Super Heavy fuel (liquid methane) load start	Success
−00:35:39	Super Heavy oxidizer (liquid oxygen) load start	Success
−00:19:40	Super Heavy and Starship engine chill	Success
−00:03:20	Starship propellant load complete	Success
−00:02:50	Super Heavy propellant load complete	Success
−00:00:30	Flight director verifies go for launch	Go for launch
−00:00:10	Flame deflector activation	Success
−00:00:03	Super Heavy engine ignition	Success
+00:00:02	Liftoff	Success
+00:01:02	Throttle down for max q during ascent (moment of peak mechanical stress on the rocket)	Success
+00:02:32	Super Heavy most engines cutoff (MECO)	Success
+00:02:39	Starship engine ignition and stage separation (hot-staging)	Success
+00:02:44	Super Heavy boostback burn start	Success
+00:03:38	Super Heavy boostback burn shutdown	Success; Burn diverted booster to Gulf of Mexico due to damage to the launch tower
+00:03:40	Hot-stage jettison	Success
+00:06:25	Super Heavy is transonic	—N/a
+00:06:34	Super Heavy landing burn start	Success
+00:06:51	Super Heavy landing burn shutdown and catch	Partial failure Catch aborted due to failed tower health check. Booster diverted to a soft splashdown in Gulf of Mexico
+00:08:27	Starship engine cutoff (SECO)	Success
+00:37:46	Raptor in-space relight start	Success
+00:37:52	Raptor in-space relight shutdown	Success
+00:47:13	Starship atmospheric reentry	Success
+01:02:06	Starship is transonic	—N/a
+01:03:12	Starship is subsonic	—N/a
+01:04:56	Starship landing flip	Success
+01:05:01	Starship landing burn	Success
+01:05:24	Starship splashdown	Success

=== Payload ===
A stuffed toy banana served as the zero-g indicator, becoming Starship's first payload, though it remained within the vehicle for the duration of the flight.
