= Starship flight test 12 =

Rocket flight test

- Mission type: Flight test
- Operator: SpaceX
- Mission duration: 1 hour, 6 minutes, 22 seconds

Spacecraft properties
- Spacecraft: Starship Ship 39
- Spacecraft type: Starship (Block 3)
- Manufacturer: SpaceX

Start of mission
- Launch date: May 22, 2026, 22:30:22 UTC (5:30:22 pm CDT)
- Rocket: Super Heavy (Block 3, B19)
- Launch site: Starbase, OLP-2

End of mission
- Destroyed: Booster 22:36:42 UTC (5:36:42 CDT)
- Landing date: Ship 23:36:50 UTC (6:36:50 CDT)
- Landing site: Super Heavy: Gulf of Mexico; Ship: Indian Ocean

Orbital parameters
- Perigee altitude: −7 km (−4.3 mi)
- Apogee altitude: 195 km (121 mi)
- Inclination: 28°

Payload
- 20 × Starlink V3 Mass Simulators; 2 × Modified Starlink V2
- Mass: ~37,500 kg (82,700 lb)

Starship flight test 12 was the twelfth flight test of a SpaceX Starship launch vehicle, using Booster 19 and Ship 39. Flight 12 featured the first use of Block 3 vehicles, as well as being the first launch from Starbase's second launch pad.

Its trajectory was more southerly to allow potential debris to fall into the open ocean in the middle of the Caribbean, rather than inhabited areas. The ship splashed down in the Indian Ocean as planned, as with most previous flights testing Starship's ability to navigate to a precise destination. The flight was originally supposed to use Booster 18, but it was destroyed shortly before cryogenic testing, resulting in Booster 19 becoming the flight vehicle.

== Background ==
=== Vehicle testing ahead of launch ===
==== Booster 18 ====
B18 assembly took place from May through October 2025 in Mega Bay 1. On November 20, 2025, it was rolled out to the Massey test site for its cryo testing campaign. However, during ambient temperature pressure testing on November 21, 2025, a composite overwrapped pressure vessel in one of the chines failed and the resultant shrapnel ruptured the LOX tank and damaged the LCH4 downcomer. It was then scrapped a few days later.

==== Booster 19 ====
B19 began stacking on November 27, 2025, with it being fully stacked on December 24. Booster 19 rolled to Massey's test site for cryogenic testing on February 1, 2026. This testing occurred shortly after arriving at Massey's where it completed an ambient gas pressure testing followed by a partial cryogenic testing and three full cryogenic tests. The booster returned to Mega Bay 1 on February 9. It rolled to launch site on March 8, 2026 for engine testing. It was lifted hours after and only had 10 engines. It conducted a tanking test followed by DSS and deluge activation on March 10, and conducted another tanking test with DSS activation, followed by a potential Spin Prime test on the 12th. It was lifted off the OLM for inspections, lifted on the 14th, and they conducted an ignitor test on the 15th and conducted a 10 engine Static Fire on the 16th. This test was aborted after ~0.37s due to a Ground Support Equipment issue, engines however successfully started. It then rolled back to Mega Bay 1 for installation of the 23 remaining engines. On April 11, it returned to the launch site with all thirty three engines, where it underwent either a cryogenic test or spin prime on April 12.

==== Ship 39 ====
S39's LOX (liquid oxygen) header tank was spotted in Starfactory on March 16, 2025. It was installed into its nosecone on April 9. The payload bay was integrated with the rest of the nosecone in mid August. Stacking of the ship concluded in mid November. S39 rolled to Massey's and placed on a repurposed static fire stand on February 26, 2026, where it conducted a cryogenic test on February 28. This testing continued on March 2, with the vehicle returning to the production site on March 8. Rollout for engine testing occurred on April 11.

== Mission profile ==
Attempt	Planned	Result	Turnaround	Reason	Decision point	Weather go (%)	Notes
1	21 May 2026, 5:30:00 pm	Scrubbed	—	Technical	21 May 2026, 6:41 pm (T−00:00:40 hold)	55	Hydraulic pin on launch tower quick disconnect arm failed to retract.
2	22 May 2026, 5:30:22 pm	Success	1 day 0 hours 0 minutes			85	

The mission profile for flight test 12, launched on 22:30 UTC May 22, 2026, was similar to the previous flight test, with Starship being placed on a suborbital flight, slightly short of reaching orbit.

After stage separation, the booster flipped abnormally rapidly, which quickly caused most of the engines to fail. During the landing burn only one engine ignited on the Super Heavy and the booster crashed into the Gulf of Mexico at a speed of 1,450 km/h instead of near the launch site as planned.

During the Ship's ascent, one of the six Raptors shut down after only 36 seconds, and the Ship performed a contingency profile which involved losing some altitude prior to SECO to build up velocity.

The ship was carrying 22 Starlink simulators, similar to the simulators on the previous test flights. They were deployed with an improved 'Pez dispenser' mechanism. The last two of these two simulators imaged the ship's heat shield during the flight. Like with the previous flight test, the ship was expected to attempt to relight one of its Raptor engines in space and conduct a banking maneuver to simulate the maneuvers needed to return to the launch site, with the addition of a maneuver that would intentionally stress the ship's front and rear flaps during re-entry. However, the relight was cancelled due to an earlier engine out. During re-entry, the ship performed a maneuver intended to stress the aft flaps and a dynamic banking test to simulate a future path ships returning to Starbase will fly. The ship successfully re-ignited two of its three center Raptor engines with one of them disabled prior to ignition, then shut down one of them before splashing down.

On May 27, the Federal Aviation Administration (FAA) declared the Super Heavy failure a mishap and required SpaceX to perform an investigation. The FAA grounded Starship until the investigation is complete.

=== Flight timeline ===
Time	Event	May 21, 2026	May 22, 2026
−00:50:00	SpaceX flight director conducts poll and verifies go for propellant load	Go for propellant loading	Go for propellant loading
−00:38:53	Ship LOX (liquid oxygen) load start	Success	Success
−00:35:00	Booster LOX load start	Success	Success
−00:34:43	Booster fuel (liquid methane) load start	Success	Success
−00:32:39	Ship fuel load start	Success	Success
−00:21:30	Raptor begins engine chill on booster and ship	Success	Success
−00:02:50	Booster propellant load complete	Success	Success
−00:02:10	Ship propellant load complete	Success	Success
−00:00:30	SpaceX flight director verifies go for launch	Go for launch, later scrubbed for technical issue	Go for launch
−00:00:17	Flame diverter activation	—N/a	Success
−00:00:03	Raptor ignition sequence begins	—N/a	Success
+00:00:00	Liftoff	—N/a	Partial success All engines lit at liftoff. One engine failed at T+00:01:42.
+00:00:45	Max q (moment of peak aerodynamic stress on the rocket)	—N/a	Success
+00:02:22	Super Heavy MECO (most engines cut off)	—N/a	Success
+00:02:24	Hot-staging (Starship Raptor ignition and stage separation)	—N/a	Partial success All six engines lit during staging. One vacuum engine failed at T+00:03:10.
+00:02:30	Super Heavy boostback burn start	—N/a	Partial failure 20/28 engines were initially relit with most of these engines failing within seconds.
+00:03:30	Super Heavy boostback burn shutdown	—N/a	Failure; Ended early at T+00:02:49
+00:06:34	Super Heavy landing burn start	—N/a	Partial failure Only one engine relit
+00:06:59	Super Heavy landing burn shutdown	—N/a	Failure; Water impact at T+00:06:20
+00:08:11	Starship engine cutoff (SECO)	—N/a	Success; Ended late at T+00:09:13 to compensate for engine out.
+00:17:37	Payload deploy demo start	—N/a	Success
+00:27:15	Payload deploy demo complete	—N/a	Success
+00:38:37	Raptor in-space relight demo	—N/a	Skipped
+00:47:47	Starship entry	—N/a	Success
+01:02:16	Starship is transonic	—N/a	—N/a
+01:03:08	Starship is subsonic	—N/a	—N/a
+01:05:06	Landing burn start	—N/a	Partial success One engine was disabled prior to ignition
+01:05:08	Landing flip	—N/a	Success
+01:05:17	Landing burn 3 to 2 engines	—N/a	—N/a
+01:05:24	Landing burn 2 to 1 engine	—N/a	Success
+01:05:26	Splashdown	—N/a	Success
Source: SpaceX
