= SpaceX Super Heavy =

Reusable first-stage rocket developed by SpaceX

Super Heavy
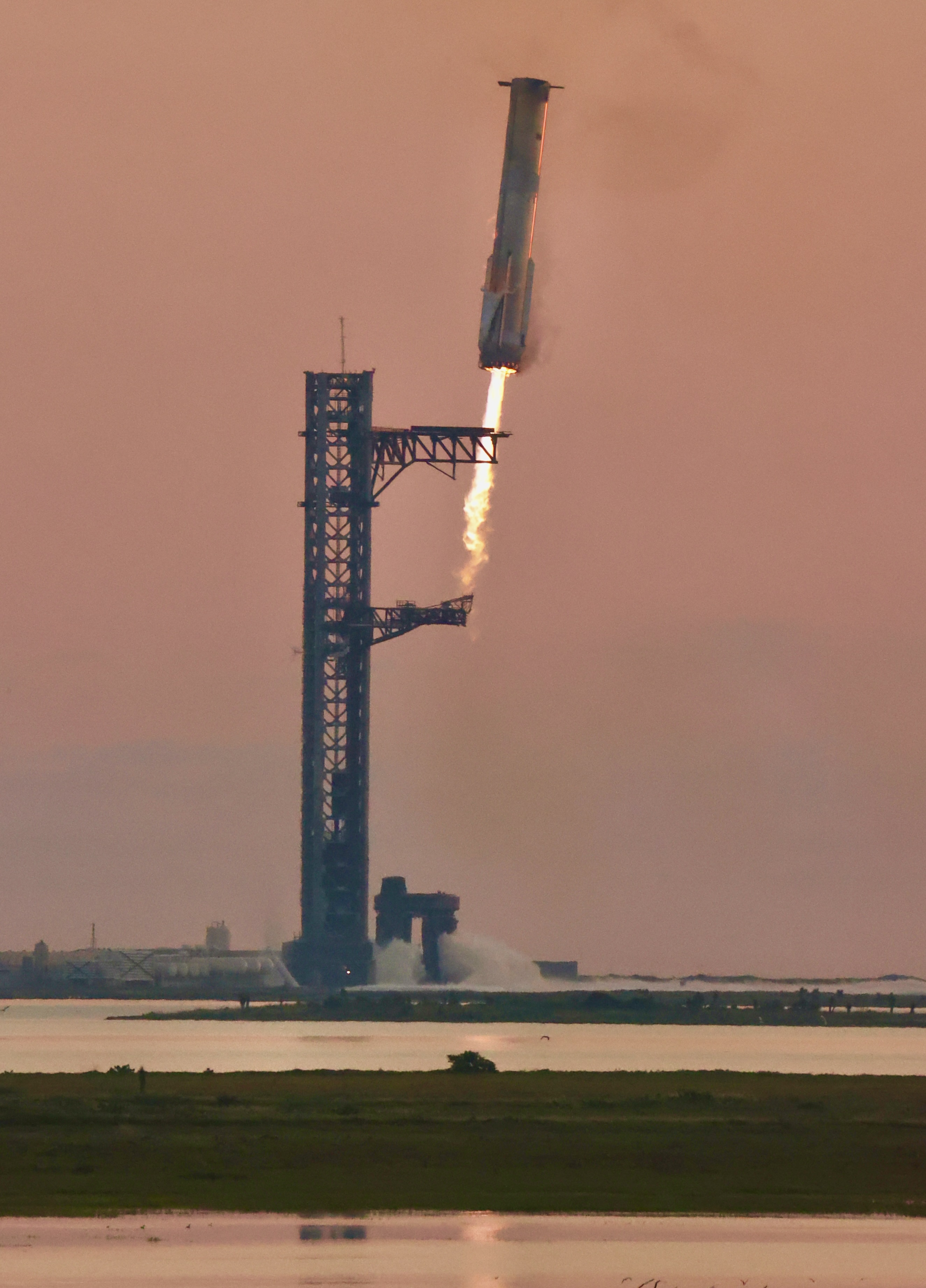
- Super Heavy Booster 12 approaching the tower during Starship flight test 5 on October 13, 2024
- Manufacturer: SpaceX
- Country of origin: United States
- Used on: SpaceX Starship

Launch history
- Status: In development
- Total launches: 15
- Failed: 1 (Flight 1)
- Other: Failed after staging: 5 (Flight 2, Flight 3, Flight 9, Flight 12, Flight 13)
- First flight: April 20, 2023

Block 1/2 Super Heavy
- Height: 71 m (233 ft), 69 m (226 ft) without Vented Interstage
- Diameter: 9 m (30 ft)
- Empty mass: 275,000 kg (606,000 lb)
- Gross mass: 3,675,000 kg (8,102,000 lb)
- Propellant mass: 3,400,000 kg (7,500,000 lb)
- Powered by: 33 × Raptor 2 engines
- Maximum thrust: 73.5 MN (16,500,000 lb_{f})
- Specific impulse: SL: 327 s (3.21 km/s), Vac: 347 s (3.40 km/s)
- Burn time: 166 seconds
- Propellant: CH_{4} / LOX

Block 3 Super Heavy
- Height: 72.3 m (237 ft)
- Diameter: 9 m (30 ft)
- Propellant mass: 3,650,000 kg (8,050,000 lb)
- Powered by: 33 × Raptor 3 engines
- Maximum thrust: 80.8 MN (18,200,000 lb_{f})
- Specific impulse: SL: 330 s (3.2 km/s), Vac: 350 s (3.4 km/s)
- Propellant: CH_{4} / LOX

Super Heavy is the reusable first stage of the SpaceX Starship super heavy-lift launch vehicle, which it composes in combination with the Starship second stage. As a part of SpaceX's Mars colonization program, the booster evolved into its current design over a decade. Production began in 2021, with the first flight being conducted on April 20, 2023, during the first launch attempt of the Starship rocket.

The booster is powered by 33 Raptor engines that use liquid oxygen and methane as propellants. It returns to its launch site after propelling the second stage toward orbit, landing vertically by being caught by the launch tower.

== Design ==
Super Heavy was initially 71 m (233 ft) tall (in its Block 1 and Block 2 design, now retired), while Block 3 Super Heavy is 72.3 meters tall. It is 9 m (30 ft) wide, and is composed of four general sections, in ascending order: the engines, the liquid oxygen tank, the liquid methane tank, and the interstage.

=== Tanks ===
The two cryogenic propellant tanks on Super Heavy are separated by a common bulkhead, a similar structural design to the S-II and S-IVB stages on the Saturn V rocket. After Starship's second flight test, the common dome's design was changed to be more elliptical, altering the propellant capacity of both tanks by a small amount. Each tank possesses roughly 74 stringers for structural reinforcement, attached to their interior walls. The booster's two tanks hold a combined 3,650 t (8,050,000 lb) of propellant: 2,860 t (6,310,000 lb) of liquid oxygen and 790 t (1,740,000 lb) of liquid methane. (Note: With a mixture ratio of 3.6 parts oxygen to 1 part methane, 78.3% of 3650 t is 2860 t of liquid oxygen.) Fuel is fed to the engines via a single liquid downcomer, and channeled into distribution manifolds of the engines.

Two quick disconnects are used for loading propellant onto the booster, with one disconnect for liquid oxygen and the other for liquid methane.

=== Propulsion ===
The aft dome of the Super Heavy booster is protected by metallic heat shield tiles. Additional thermal protection is present on some parts of the thrust vector control system. This system uses electric actuators on the thirteen engines in the middle and center rings. Unlike the ascent and boostback burns, which use all thirty-three engines, the landing burn uses only these inner thirteen and draws fuel from dedicated header tanks.

The Raptor engine uses a full-flow staged combustion cycle with oxygen and methane-rich turbopumps. Before 2014, only two full-flow staged-combustion rocket engine designs had advanced enough to undergo testing: the Soviet RD-270 project in the 1960s and the Aerojet Rocketdyne Integrated Powerhead Demonstrator in the mid-2000s. To improve performance, the engines burn subcooled propellant; i.e. the propellants are cooled below their respective boiling points to further increase their density and the engine mass flow rates.

The Block 1 version of the booster (used through November 2024) produced a total of 73.5 MN (16,500,000 lb_{f}), just over twice that of the NASA Saturn V first stage, with this total being expected to increase to 80.8 MN (18,200,000 lb_{f}) for Block 3 boosters and later up to 98.1 MN (22,100,000 lb_{f}) with the planned Block 4 vehicle. The thirty-three engines collectively produce large shock diamonds in the exhaust jet, visible during ascent and descent.

During unpowered flight in the upper atmosphere, control authority is provided by cold gas thrusters fed with residual ullage gas. Four perpendicular vents are located within the interstage. Additional vents are located just below the common dome, pointing toward the engines at a slight angle.

=== Interstage ===
The interstage and forward heat shield of the super heavy booster, which enable hot staging, are directly integrated into the methane tank. During hot staging, Super Heavy shuts down all but five inner engines, and remains attached to Starship until the upper stage ignites its own engines. Also embedded into the methane tank are three electrically actuated grid fins, in a 90/90/180 degree arrangement. Two of these fins have hardpoints, which are used for lifting the vehicle onto the launch mount and for catching the booster when it lands at the launch tower.

Animation of Super Heavy's integration to the launch mount, using mechanical arms

== Manufacturing ==
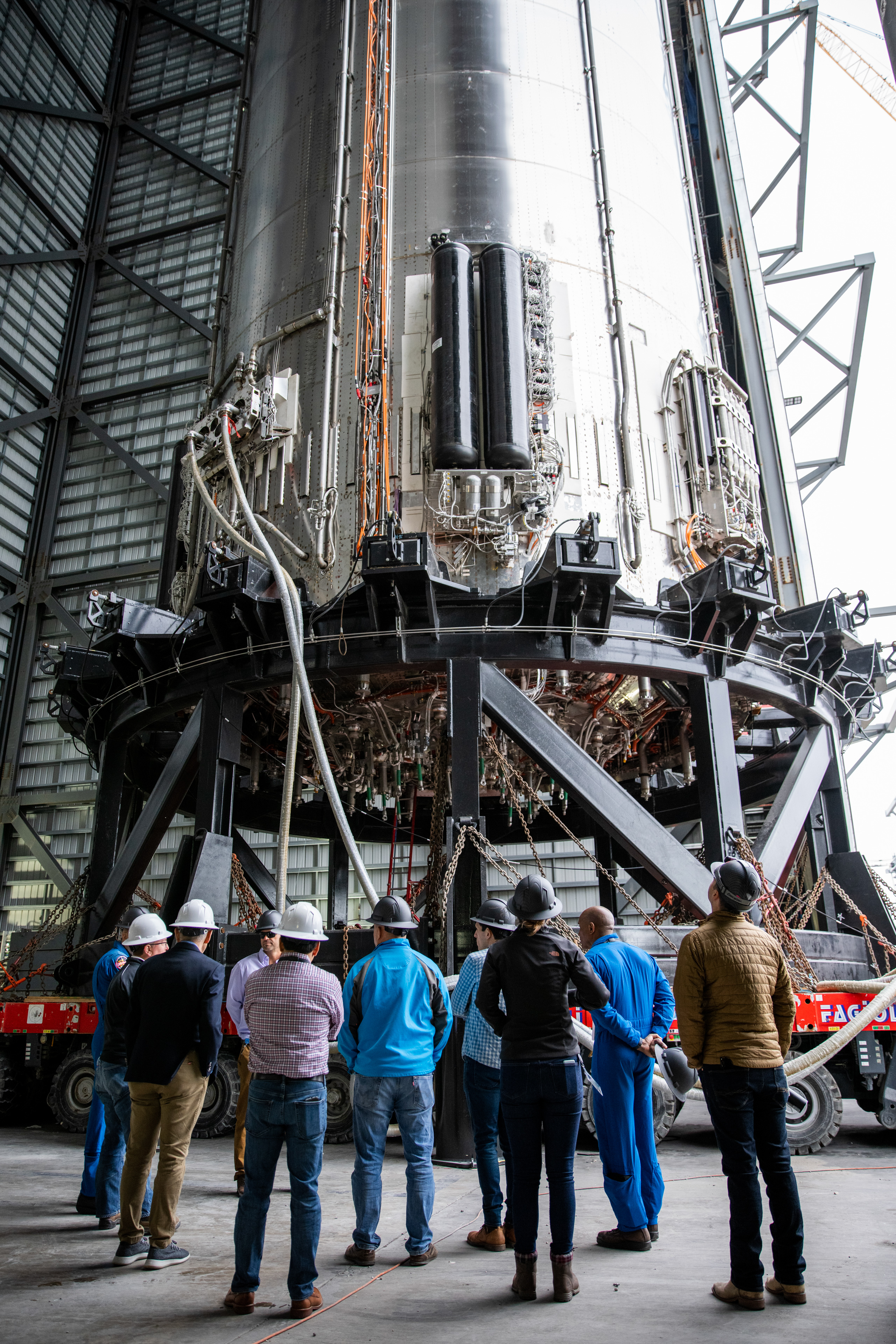
Underside of a 29-engine Super Heavy booster prior to engine installation

The manufacturing process starts with rolls of stainless steel, which are unrolled, cut, and welded along an edge to create a cylinder of 9 m (30 ft) diameter, 1.83 m (6.00 ft) tall, and 3.97 mm (0.156 in) thick, and approximately 1600 kg (3,600 lb) in mass. (Note: This is based on the dimensions of the ring and 304L stainless steel's density of 7.93 g/cm^{3}.) Thirty-three such rings are used in the Super Heavy Booster, while four rings are 1.4 m (4 ft 7 in) tall. These shorter rings are used exclusively in the aft section. A 1 m (3 ft 3 in) and a 1.7 m (5 ft 7 in) tall ring are used to construct the liquid oxygen header tank. These rings have a significantly smaller diameter than the main rings.

The forward dome is constructed out of two segments: the "dome knuckle" and the "dome frustum". The aft dome has a third component: the "thrust puck", which supports the inner thirteen engines, while the common dome is composed of a single part, and is more elliptical than the forward and aft domes.

These rings are stacked and robotically welded along their edges to form stacks of three to four rings in the Starfactory. Stringers are then added to the ring stacks, improving the structural strength of the booster. Cutouts are made for the grid fins and hardpoints for the forward section. Following this, the domes are installed within the forward, aft, and common ring stacks. The forward ring stack consists of three rings, and the common ring stack consists of four. The aft section is constructed solely from the four 1.4 m (4 ft 7 in) rings. Tank vents and external piping are added at this stage, followed by the COPVs and header tank.

Following the completion of each of the ring stacks, the stacking of these sections begins with the assembly of the methane tank. This process occurs in Mega Bay 1. Once the methane tank is completed, the oxygen tank is assembled, already integrated to the common dome. Before assembly of the oxygen tank is finished, the methane downcomer is added, along with final stringers to the weld lines. When both tanks are complete, the methane tank is stacked onto the oxygen tank, completing the primary tankage assembly. Chines are added after this stage.

The vehicle is then rolled to the Massey's test site and cryogenically tested twice. These tests fill both tanks with liquid nitrogen, which is nonflammable, though liquid oxygen may be loaded as well. After returning to the production site, the engines are installed, alongside their shielding, which forms the aft bay. This is followed by static fire testing at the launch site. Once this test is completed, the vented interstage is added to the vehicle.

== History ==
=== Early concepts ===
==== Mars Colonial Transporter ====
In October 2012, the company made the first public articulation of plans to develop a fully reusable rocket system with substantially greater capabilities than SpaceX's existing Falcon 9. Later in 2012, the company first mentioned the Mars Colonial Transporter rocket concept in public. It was going to be able to carry 100 t (220,000 lb) of cargo to Mars and would be powered by methane-fueled Raptor engines. Musk referred to this new launch vehicle under the unspecified acronym "MCT", revealed to stand for "Mars Colonial Transporter" in 2013, which would serve the company's Mars system architecture. SpaceX chief operating officer Gwynne Shotwell gave a potential payload range between 150 and 200 tons to low Earth orbit for the planned rocket. According to SpaceX engine development head Tom Mueller, SpaceX could use nine Raptor engines on a single MCT booster or spacecraft. The preliminary design would be at least 10 meters (33 ft) in diameter, and was expected to have up to three cores totaling at least 27 booster engines.

==== Interplanetary Transport System ====
On September 27, 2016, at the 67th International Astronautical Congress, SpaceX CEO Elon Musk announced SpaceX was developing a new rocket using Raptor engines called the Interplanetary Transport System (ITS). It would have two stages, a reusable booster and a spacecraft. The stages' tanks were to be made from carbon composite, storing liquid methane and liquid oxygen. Despite the rocket's 300 t (660,000 lb) launch capacity to low Earth orbit, it was expected to have a low launch price per kilogram of payload. The concept, especially the technological feats required to make such a system possible and the funds needed, garnered substantial skepticism. Both stages would use autogenous pressurization of the propellant tanks, eliminating the Falcon 9's problematic high-pressure helium pressurization system.

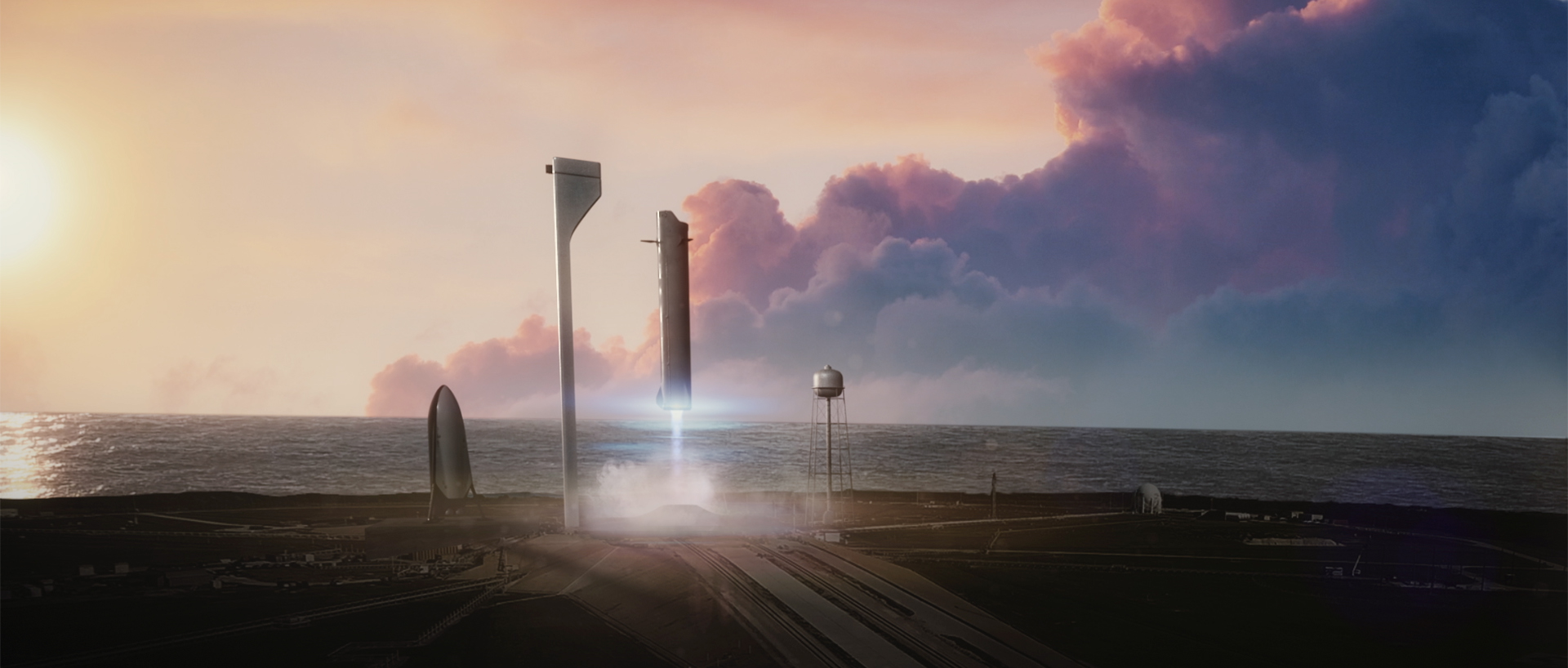
2016 artist's concept of the ITS booster returning to the launch pad

The ITS booster was to be a 12 m-diameter (39 ft), 77.5 m-high (254 ft), reusable first stage powered by 42 engines, each producing 3,024 kilonewtons (680,000 lbf) of thrust. Total booster thrust would have been 128 MN (29,000,000 lbf) at liftoff, increasing to 138 MN (31,000,000 lbf) in a vacuum, several times the 36 MN (8,000,000 lbf) thrust of the Saturn V. It weighed 275 tonnes (606,000 lb) when empty and 6,700 tonnes (14,800,000 lb) when completely filled with propellant. It would have used grid fins to help guide the booster through the atmosphere for a precise landing. The engine configuration included 21 engines in an outer ring and 14 in an inner ring. The center cluster of seven engines would be able to gimbal for directional control. However, some directional control would be achieved via differential thrust with the fixed engines. Each engine could throttle to between 20 and 100 percent of rated thrust.

The design goal was to achieve a separation velocity of about 8,650 km/h (5,370 mph) while retaining about 7% of the initial propellant to achieve a vertical landing at the launch pad.The design called for grid fins to guide the booster during atmospheric reentry. The booster return flights were expected to encounter loads lower than the Falcon 9, principally because the ITS would have both a lower mass ratio and a lower density. The booster was to be designed for 20 g nominal loads, and possibly as high as 30–40 g.

In contrast to the landing approach used on SpaceX's Falcon 9—either a large, flat concrete pad or downrange floating landing platform, the ITS booster was to be designed to land on the launch mount itself, for immediate refueling and relaunch.

==== Big Falcon Rocket ====
In September 2017, at the 68th annual meeting of the International Astronautical Congress, Musk announced a new launch vehicle calling it the BFR, again changing the name, though stating that the name was temporary. The acronym was alternatively stated as standing for Big Falcon Rocket or Big Fucking Rocket, a tongue-in-cheek reference to the BFG from the Doom video game series. The vehicle was designed to be 106 meters (348 ft) tall, 9 meters (30 ft) in diameter, and made of carbon composites.

=== Starship ===
In December 2018, the structural material was changed from carbon composites to stainless steel, marking the transition from early design concepts of the Starship. Musk cited numerous reasons for the design change; low cost and ease of manufacture, increased strength of stainless steel at cryogenic temperatures, as well as its ability to withstand high heat. In 2019, SpaceX began to refer to the entire vehicle as Starship, with the second stage being called Starship and the booster Super Heavy. In September 2019, Musk held an event about Starship development during which he further detailed the booster.

==== Ground testing ====
In March 2021, SpaceX assembled the first Super Heavy prototype, BN1, a production pathfinder for future vehicles. It was scrapped on March 30. The next booster, BN3, was completed on June 29, 2021. It conducted the first cryogenic proof test of a Super Heavy on July 13, followed by the only static fire of a Super Heavy booster at the Suborbital Launch Site on July 19. It was partially scrapped in August, with the process concluding in January 2022.

Booster 4 was the first vehicle intended to fly on Starship's Flight Test 1. It was the first Super Heavy to be stacked with Starship, and conducted multiple cryogenic tests before being retired in favor of Booster 7 and Ship 24.

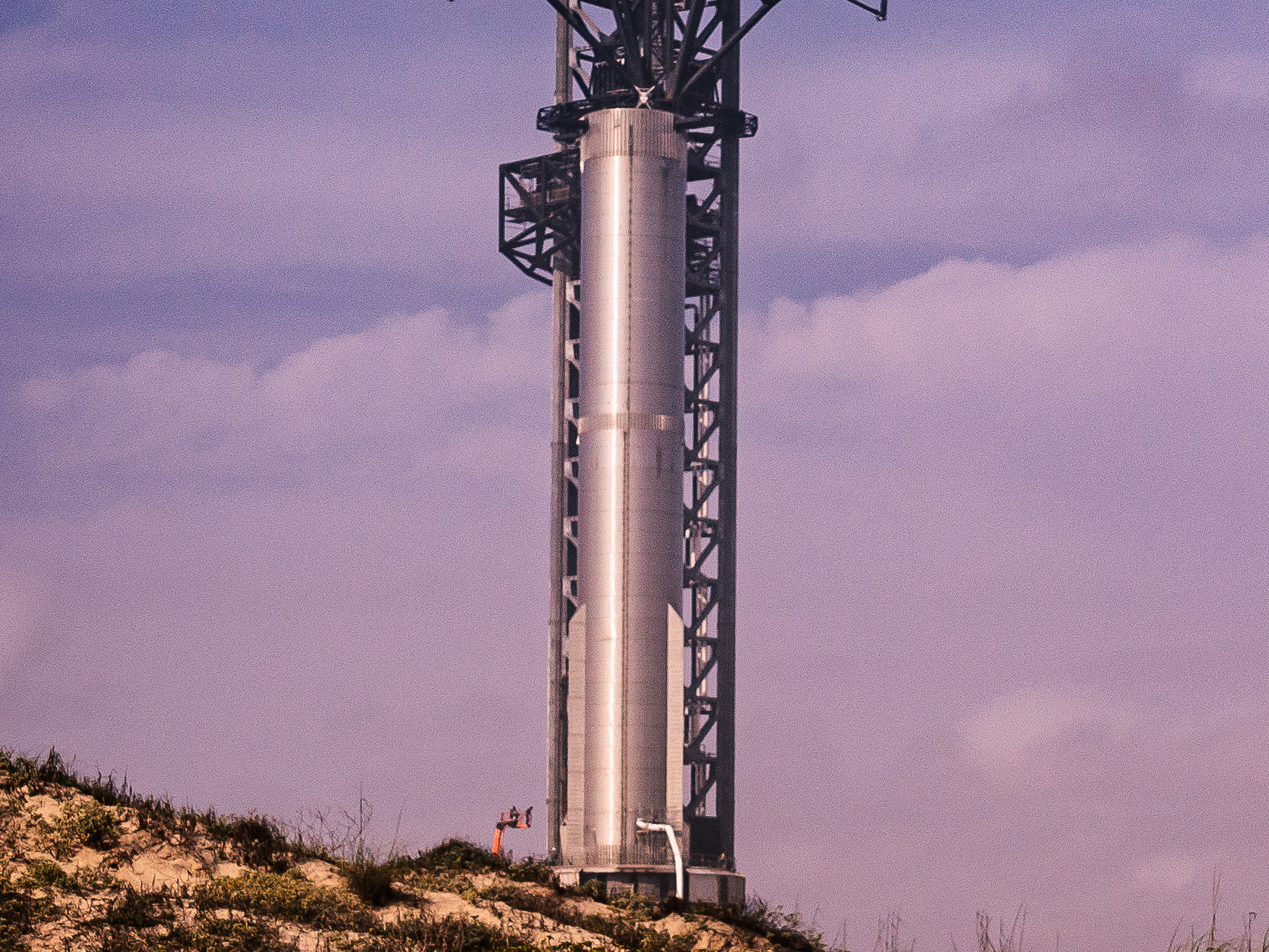
Booster 7 being tested on the orbital launch pad at Starbase, Boca Chica, Texas, in February 2023

==== Flight testing ====
Booster 7 and Ship 24 conducted several static fire and spin prime tests before launch, with the first such test causing significant damage to Booster 7 on July 11, 2022. After a launch attempt aborted on April 17, 2023, Booster 7 and Ship 24 launched on April 20 at 13:33 UTC in the first orbital flight test. Three engines were disabled during the launch sequence and several more failed during the flight. The flight concluded when the booster lost thrust vectoring control of the Raptor engines, resulting in the rocket spinning out of control. The flight termination system (FTS) was activated, though the vehicle tumbled for another 40 seconds before disintegrating.

After the first test flight, SpaceX began work on the launch mount to repair the damage it sustained during the test and to prevent future issues. The foundation of the launch tower was reinforced and a water-powered flame deflector was built under the launch mount. Ship 25 and Booster 9 were rolled to the suborbital and orbital launch sites in May to undergo multiple tests.

On November 18, 2023, Booster 9 and Ship 25 lifted off the pad. All 33 engines continued to function until staging, where the second stage separated by pushing itself away from the first stage using a hot-staging technique. Following separation, the Super Heavy booster completed its flip maneuver and initiated the boostback burn before exploding following multiple successive engine failures. Three and a half minutes into the flight at an altitude of ~90 km over the Gulf of Mexico, blockage in a liquid oxygen filter caused one of the engines to fail resulting in the destruction of the booster.

Flight 3 launched from the SpaceX Starbase facility along the South Texas coast around 8:25 CDT on March 14, 2024, coincidentally the 22nd anniversary of its founding. Like on the previous flight, all 33 engines on the booster ignited and stage separation was successful. B10 conducted a boostback burn, however, the planned landing in the Gulf of Mexico was not successful, as it exploded at 462 m (1,516 ft) above the surface.

The fourth integrated flight test of the full Starship configuration launched on June 6, 2024, at 7:50 am CDT. The goals for the test flight were for the Super Heavy booster to land on a 'virtual tower' in the ocean. Super Heavy achieved a soft splashdown, before being destroyed after tipping over.

In April 2024, Musk stated one of the goals was to attempt a booster tower landing based on successful booster performance in flight 4. Vehicle testing commenced in May 2024. SpaceX claimed that B12 and S30 were ready to launch in early August, in advance of regulatory approval. SpaceX flew S30 and B12 on October 13, 2024, with B12 returning to the launch site for a catch. After B13 aborted its catch attempt during flight 6, B14 was caught during flight 7, and was later reused on flight 9.

== Mission profile ==
Super Heavy and Starship are stacked onto their launch mount and loaded with fuel via the booster quick disconnect and ship quick disconnect arm. At the T – 19:40 mark, engine chill begins on the booster. This is to protect the engine's turbopumps from thermal shock. At three seconds before launch, the engine startup sequence begins.

After liftoff, the engines burn for approximately 159 seconds before Super Heavy cuts off all but three of its center gimbaling rocket engines at an altitude of roughly 64 km (40 mi). It throttles down the remaining engines, before Starship ignites its engines while still attached to the booster, and separates. The booster then rotates, before igniting ten additional engines for a "boostback burn" which stops all forward velocity and reverses the trajectory towards the launch site. After the boostback burn, the booster's engines shut off with Super Heavy on a trajectory for a controlled descent to the launch site using its grid fins for minor course corrections. At six minutes after launch, shortly before landing, it ignites its inner 13 engines, then shuts off all but the inner 3, slowing it sufficiently to be caught by a pair of hydraulic actuating arms attached to the launch tower.

With Version 3, Super Heavy cuts to only 5 engines for the boostback burn, and once Ship disconnects, booster flips back towards Starbase and lights all 33 engines, before shutting down the outer 20 and using the inner 13 for the rest of the burn. For the landing burn, the booster lights all 13 inner engines, before transitioning to 5 engines, and then 3 engines, before being caught.
