= Starship flight test 3 =

Third launch of SpaceX Starship

- Video of Starship during flight test 3
- Mission type: Flight test
- Operator: SpaceX
- Mission duration: 49 minutes, 41 seconds (achieved); 1 hour, 4 minutes, 39 seconds (planned)
- Orbits completed: <1

Spacecraft properties
- Spacecraft: Starship Ship 28
- Spacecraft type: Starship
- Manufacturer: SpaceX

Start of mission
- Launch date: March 14, 2024, 8:25 am CDT (13:25 UTC)
- Rocket: Super Heavy (B10)
- Launch site: Starbase, OLP-1

End of mission
- Destroyed: Ship:March 14, 2024, 9:14:41 am CDT (14:14:41 UTC) Booster:March 14, 2024, 8:32:01 am CDT (13:32:01 UTC)

Orbital parameters
- Regime: Suborbital
- Periapsis altitude: -54 km
- Apoapsis altitude: 234 km (145 mi)
- Inclination: 26.5°
- Mission patch SpaceX Starship flight tests

Starship flight test 3 was the third flight test of the SpaceX Starship launch vehicle. SpaceX performed the flight test on March 14, 2024.

Starship successfully completed a full-duration second stage burn, reaching the intended orbital velocity for the first time, but broke up during re-entry in the atmosphere.

== Background ==
=== Changes from the previous flight ===
After the second flight test in November 2023 ended in the destruction of both the Super Heavy booster and the Starship spacecraft, 17 significant changes were made to the vehicles, including upgrading the ship to an electric thrust vector control (TVC) system (the booster had received similar upgrades for the second flight test) and delaying the vent of liquid oxygen (LOX) to after Starship engine cutoff (SECO).

SpaceX upgraded the orbital tank farm with additional subcoolers and pumps to increase the propellant flow rate. In addition, two water tanks were removed and scrapped. Steel plates have been added to concrete at the base of the launch tower due to erosion from the engines. A concrete wall has replaced the HESCO barriers previously protecting the tank farm.

=== Development prior to launch ===
Testing of the Flight 3 vehicles began just under a month after second flight test, with S28 and B10 undergoing their individual static fire tests in late December 2023. The FAA closed its mishap investigation of the second flight test on February 26, 2024. In the mishap report, SpaceX identified 17 corrective actions, of which ten were for the Starship upper stage and seven for the Super Heavy booster. Booster 10 and S28 conducted a wet dress rehearsal on March 3, 2024. On March 5, 2024, SpaceX announced that they were targeting a launch date of March 14, 2024, pending regulatory approval. On March 13, 2024, the FAA granted the launch license for this flight, the third flight test. The assembly of the launch vehicle began earlier in the winter, with the Super Heavy Booster 10 rolling out to the orbital launch pad on December 18, 2023. Following individual engine tests, SpaceX successfully completed a full dual-stage propellant loading simulation, known as a wet dress rehearsal, filling the stacked rocket with over 10 million pounds of liquid methane and liquid oxygen. After securing final flight modifications and clearing safety reviews, the vehicle was cleared for its flight timeline.

== Flight profile ==
Starship flight test 3 launched from the SpaceX Starbase facility along the South Texas coast at approximately 8:25 a.m. CDT. Ignition of all 33 booster engines and stage separation were successful. B10 began its planned boostback burn. However, six engines shut down unexpectedly, causing the boostback burn to terminate prematurely; The planned landing of the booster in the Gulf of Mexico was not achieved after multiple engines failed during the boostback maneuver leaving seven engines commanded to restart, of which two successfully reignited. Following the engine failures, the booster lost control and was destroyed by the flight termination system at an altitude of approximately 462 meters (1,516 ft). SpaceX determined that the failures were caused by clogged filters in the liquid oxygen supply to the engines. A similar issue had occurred during the second flight test, and SpaceX subsequently upgraded the filtering system on later boosters.

The Starship spacecraft itself reached space and the intended orbital velocity. It then conducted several tests after engine cutoff, including a successful propellant transfer demo and payload dispenser test. It attempted to re-enter the atmosphere over the Indian Ocean, and at an altitude of around 65 km, all telemetry from Ship 28 stopped, indicating a loss of the vehicle. According to SpaceX, S28 was experiencing excessive roll rates causing it to have an "off-nominal entry". This was caused by clogging of the valves responsible for roll control on Starship.

=== Flight timeline ===
Time	Event	March 14, 2024
−01:15:00	Flight director conducts a poll and verifies go for propellant loading	Go for propellant loading
−00:53:00	Starship oxidizer (liquid oxygen) load start	Success
−00:51:00	Starship fuel (liquid methane) load start	Success
−00:42:00	Super Heavy oxidizer (liquid oxygen) load start	Success
−00:41:00	Super Heavy fuel (liquid methane) load start	Success
−00:19:40	Super Heavy and Starship engine chill	Success
−00:03:30	Starship propellant load complete	Success
−00:02:50	Super Heavy propellant load complete	Success
−00:00:30	Flight director verifies go for launch	Go for launch
−00:00:10	Flame deflector activation	Success
−00:00:03	Super Heavy engine ignition	Success
+00:00:02	Liftoff	Success
+00:00:52	Throttle down for max q during ascent (moment of peak mechanical stress on the rocket)	Success
+00:02:42	Super Heavy most engines cutoff (MECO)	Success
+00:02:44	Starship engine ignition and stage separation (hot-staging)	Success
+00:02:55	Super Heavy boostback burn start	Success
+00:03:50	Super Heavy boostback burn shutdown	Partial failure 6 engines shut down due to LOX filter blockage, causing the burn to end prematurely
+00:06:36	Super Heavy is transonic	—N/a; Later than planned due to off nominal trajectory caused by early boostback shutdown
+00:06:46	Super Heavy landing burn start	Partial failure 2 out of 13 engines ignited
+00:07:04	Super Heavy landing burn shutdown	Failure; Loss of telemetry from booster at T+7:01 at an approximate altitude 462 m (1,516 ft)
+00:08:35	Starship engine cutoff (SECO)	Success
+00:11:56	Payload door open	Success
+00:24:31	Propellant transfer demo	Success
+00:28:21	Payload door close	Success
+00:40:46	Raptor in-space relight demo	—N/a; Skipped due to loss of roll control
+00:49:05	Starship atmospheric reentry	Failure; Stuck roll control valve during coast phase resulted in loss of control and vehicle telemetry was lost at T+49:41 at an altitude of 65 km (40 mi)
+01:02:16	Starship is transonic	—N/a
+01:03:04	Starship is subsonic	—N/a
+01:04:39	Starship splashdown	—N/a

== Aftermath ==
After the launch, SpaceX confirmed that Super Heavy was destroyed at 462 m above sea level over the Gulf of Mexico. The status of the payload door test became one of the focuses of unofficial interpretations of the flight in YouTube and news articles, due to a perceived issue seen from the flight video concerning the payload door. SpaceX's account of the launch states that the payload test had been a success.

Gwynne Shotwell, president and chief operating officer of SpaceX, said the company was still investigating the data and what went wrong in the third flight test, but that the fourth flight test could launch soon, possibly by early May.

NASA administrator Bill Nelson praised SpaceX for "a successful test flight". He also stated, "Today we are making great strides through Artemis to return humanity to the Moon - then look onward to Mars." SpaceX founder and CEO Elon Musk also praised the team and stated "Starship will take humanity to Mars."

On March 14, 2024, the FAA declared that a mishap had occurred involving both the upper stage and booster, triggering the start of a SpaceX-led investigation overseen by the FAA. The agency's associate administrator for commercial space transportation, Kelvin Coleman, said on March 18 that he did not anticipate any major issues that could delay the investigation. Additionally, there was talk for the FAA to begin issuing a "portfolio of launches", authorizing multiple launches rather than a single launch at a time, as part of a broader effort to streamline the launch license process in response to criticism from SpaceX and Congress that the FAA was moving too slow on approving them. The next launch license will likely require modification, but Coleman said the FAA may be able to first complete a public safety determination, finding that there were no flaws in critical safety systems on the March launch that would have endangered the safety of the uninvolved public. If so, “that would decouple the mishap investigation from the license modification, and that means that we could get the license modification done while the mishap investigation is ongoing.” However, both are still needed in order for a launch license to be granted.

On April 5, SpaceX requested that the FAA agree that the third flight test mishap did not present a public safety issue. On May 11, SpaceX founder and CEO Elon Musk stated that the fourth Starship launch could occur in 3-5 weeks, bringing the date forward to early-mid June. The FAA investigation and launch license remained pending. On May 17, the FAA made a statement that if the FAA agrees no public safety issues were involved in the mishap, SpaceX may return to flight while the third flight test investigation remains open, provided all other license requirements are met. This statement does not constitute SpaceX being granted a Launch License.

On May 24, SpaceX released a blog post stating the results from flight 3. According to SpaceX, during the boostback burn, 6 engines began to shut down, causing an early boostback shutdown. The vehicle prevented these engines from performing the landing burn, leaving only 7 engines. 2 of the engines were able to successfully ignite. The vehicle had lower than expected thrust, and it was lost at an altitude of 462 meters. The main likely cause of the boostback shutdown was due to filter blockage in the liquid oxygen intake, leading to loss of pressure in the oxygen turbopumps. According to SpaceX, several minutes after the ship engine cutoff (SECO), the valves responsible for the roll control thrusters were clogged. This precluded the in flight raptor relight test. Due to the unplanned roll, the ship experienced much higher heat loads in both unprotected and tiled sections.

In order to mitigate these issues, SpaceX has implemented hardware changes to the booster liquid oxygen tank to improve propellant filtration. SpaceX has also added more roll control thrusters on the ship for redundancy. Additionally, hardware and software changes were implemented to improve Raptor startup reliability.
