= Starship flight test 5 =

Fifth launch of SpaceX Starship

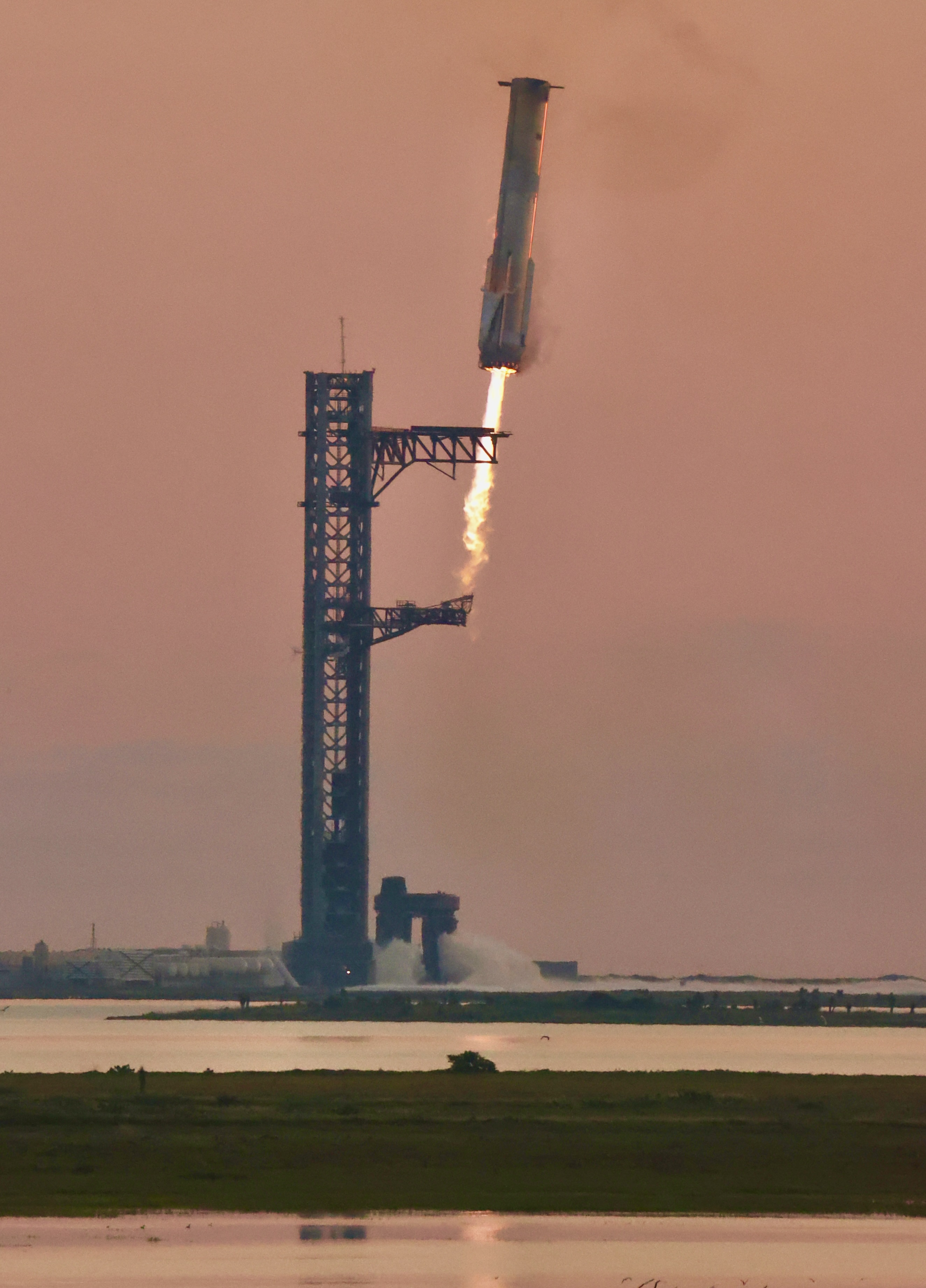
- Booster 12 on final approach to the launch tower
- Mission type: Suborbital flight test
- Operator: SpaceX
- Mission duration: 1 hour, 5 minutes, 40 seconds

Spacecraft properties
- Spacecraft: Starship Ship 30
- Spacecraft type: Starship
- Manufacturer: SpaceX

Start of mission
- Launch date: October 13, 2024, 7:25 am CDT (12:25 UTC)
- Rocket: Super Heavy (B12)
- Launch site: Starbase, OLP-1

End of mission
- Landing date: Super Heavy: October 13, 2024, 7:31:56 am CDT (12:31:56 UTC); Ship: October 13, 2024, 8:30:40 am CDT (13:30:40 UTC)
- Landing site: Super Heavy: Starbase, OLP-1; Ship: Indian Ocean

Orbital parameters
- Regime: Suborbital
- Periapsis altitude: −15 km (−9.3 mi)
- Apoapsis altitude: 213 km (132 mi)
- Inclination: 26.2°
- Mission patch SpaceX Starship flight tests

Starship flight test 5 was the fifth flight test of a SpaceX Starship launch vehicle, and the first "catch" at the launch tower of a returning Super Heavy vehicle. SpaceX performed the flight test on October 13, 2024. The prototype vehicles flown were the Starship Ship 30 upper stage and Super Heavy Booster 12.

After launching and delivering the Starship upper stage into a suborbital trajectory heading toward a splashdown in the Indian Ocean, the Super Heavy booster turned around and fired its Raptor engines to return to the launch site. As the booster approached the launch pad, it slowed to a near hover and did a horizontal slide maneuver to line itself up with two massive "chopstick" arms on the launch tower, called "Mechazilla". The arms then closed around the booster before the engines shut down.

The rocket launched on the morning of 13 October 2024, one day after the Federal Aviation Administration (FAA) issued a launch permit that had been delayed since early August and after weeks of increasingly public feuding between SpaceX and the FAA.

== Development prior to launch ==
=== Technical development ===
During a company all-hands in April 2024, SpaceX CEO Elon Musk expanded briefly on the goals of flight test 5, stating that the first tower landing could occur, depending on B11's virtual landing performance during the fourth flight test. In June, Musk stated the heatshield tiles on the flight 5 vehicle will be twice as strong along with a new ablative protection layer underneath. The process of removing the old Thermal Protection System began on June 11. Multiple tests occurred with the hydraulic arms on the launch tower in preparation for the booster catch.

=== Vehicle testing ahead of launch ===
Static fire testing of Ship 30 occurred in early May in preparation for flight 5. This was the last static fire conducted at the now-demolished Suborbital Pad B, as all subsequent tests use the static fire stand at Massey's Test Site. Booster 12 moved to the launch pad on July 9. The booster performed a spin prime test on July 12; it was the first time a spin prime test was performed since Booster 9 in August 2023. A static fire of Booster 12 was completed on July 15 and Ship 30 static fire was conducted on July 26. On September 21, S30 was stacked onto B12, with SpaceX claiming that this stack was for Flight 5, "pending regulatory approval".

=== FAA dispute and environmental concerns ===
On June 12, the Federal Aviation Administration (FAA) said that no mishap investigation would be required prior to the launch of flight 5. In anticipation of the fifth flight, SpaceX applied for a communications license from the Federal Communications Commission (FCC), with a start date of July 19. In early August, SpaceX claimed that both stages were ready to fly for flight test 5.

In September, SpaceX communicated that the FAA had shifted their license approval timeframe from later that month to November, and wrote about issues with the FAA's licensing processes for Starship flight tests. SpaceX claimed that government paperwork prevented it from flying Starship quickly to meet commitments to the Artemis program. In a statement to journalists, the FAA reiterated that the license authorizing Starship test flight 4 also allowed for multiple flights of the same vehicle configuration and mission profile. However, because SpaceX chose to modify both in an attempt to "catch" the Super Heavy booster through a return-to-launch-site maneuver, it triggered a more in-depth review because of the changed impact location of the hot stage ring and the sonic boom that would be generated. The delay was described as being 60 days because of the required consultation with the US Fish & Wildlife Service for the sonic boom effects and also 60 days of consultation with the National Marine Fisheries Service for the impact on ocean wildlife. This was repeated by the FAA on October 2. Despite this, the FAA issued a license for the launch on October 12, without offering any explanation as to what prompted the change.

== Mission summary ==
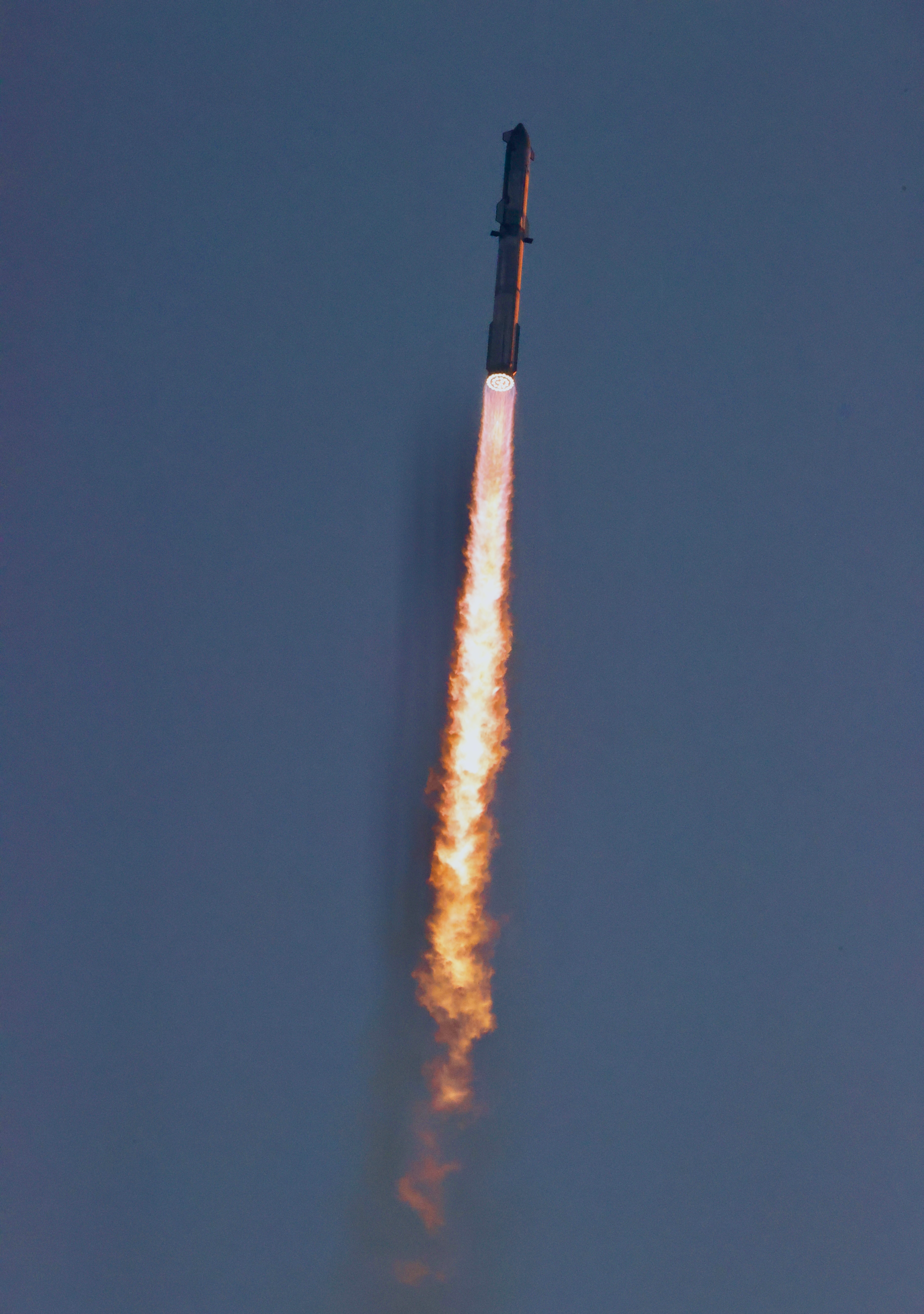
Starship during Flight 5

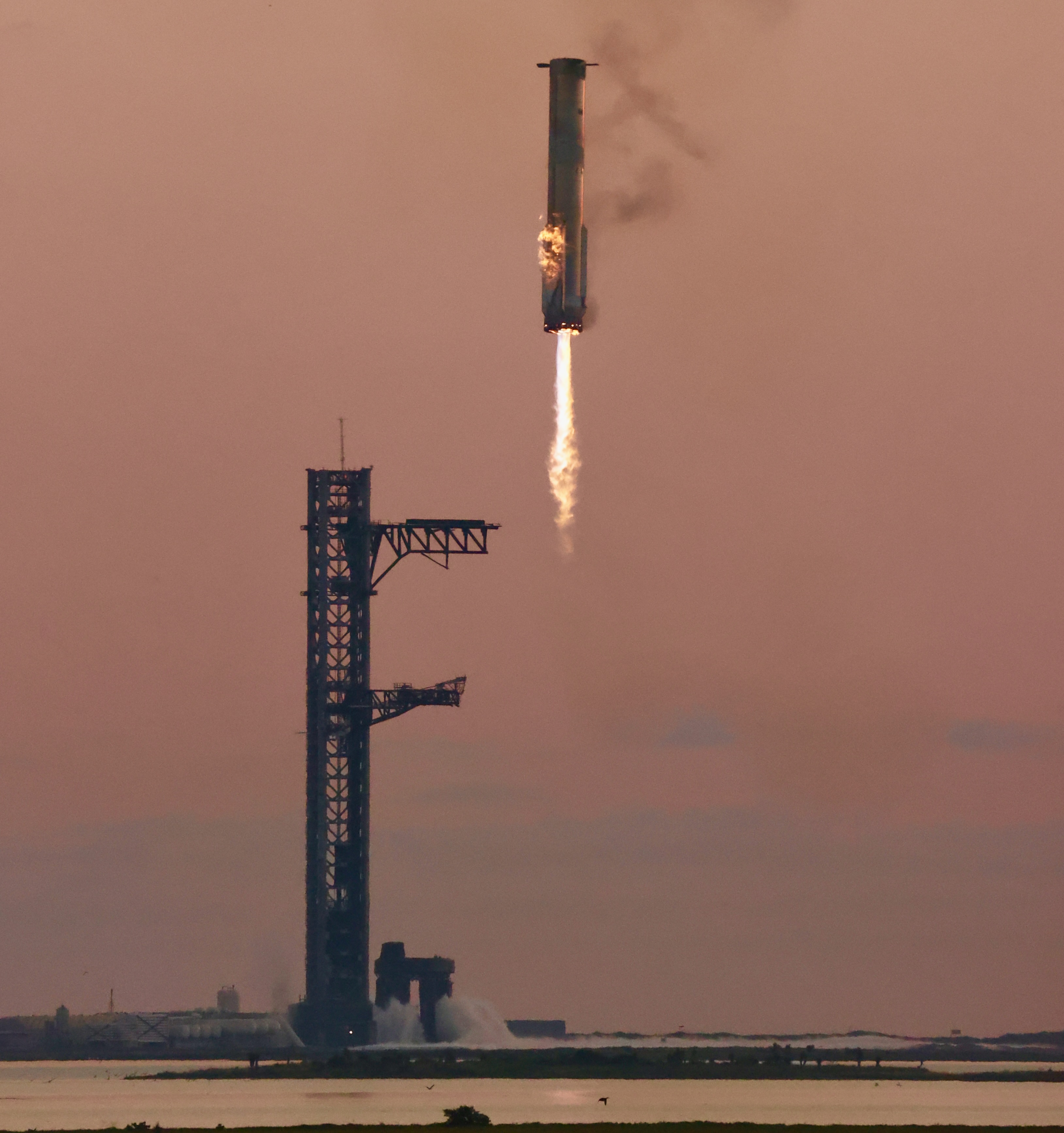
Starship booster landing approach

The mission profile for flight test 5 differed from the previous flight. While Ship 30 splashed down in the Indian Ocean, as Ship 29 did, B12 shut off its engines thirteen seconds earlier and returned to the launch site for a catch.

After launching and delivering the Starship upper stage to an altitude of 69 kilometers (43 mi) on a trajectory heading toward space, the Super Heavy booster flipped around and fired its Raptor engines to return to the launch site. As the booster approached the launch pad, the launch mount reactivated its water deluge system to prevent damage. The booster slowed to a near hover and did a horizontal slide maneuver to line itself up with two massive "chopstick" arms on the launch tower, "Mechazilla". The arms then closed around the booster before the engines shut down.

The upper-stage Starship spacecraft reached an apogee of 212 km (132 mi) before a controlled water landing in the Indian Ocean. Video showed minor damage to the control flaps during re-entry, but despite this, it splashed down with high accuracy in the water near a pre-positioned buoy that captured video of the splashdown. Ship 30, which was never intended to be recovered, erupted in a large fireball about 16 seconds after it hit the water.

=== Flight timeline ===
Time	Event	October 13, 2024
−01:15:00	Flight director conducts a poll and verifies go for propellant loading	Go for propellant loading
−00:49:50	Starship fuel (liquid methane) load start	Success
−00:48:40	Starship oxidizer (liquid oxygen) load start	Success
−00:40:40	Super Heavy fuel (liquid methane) load start	Success
−00:34:03	Super Heavy oxidizer (liquid oxygen) load start	Success
−00:19:40	Super Heavy and Starship engine chill	Success
−00:03:20	Starship propellant load complete	Success
−00:02:50	Super Heavy propellant load complete	Success
−00:00:30	Flight director verifies go for launch	Go for launch
−00:00:10	Flame deflector activation	Success
−00:00:03	Super Heavy engine ignition	Success
+00:00:02	Liftoff	Success
+00:01:02	Throttle down for max q during ascent (moment of peak mechanical stress on the rocket)	Success
+00:02:35	Super Heavy most engines cutoff (MECO)	Success
+00:02:40	Starship engine ignition and stage separation (hot-staging)	Success
+00:02:45	Super Heavy boostback burn start	Success
+00:03:41	Super Heavy boostback burn shutdown	Success
+00:03:43	Hot-stage jettison	Success
+00:06:08	Super Heavy is supersonic	—N/a
+00:06:30	Super Heavy landing burn start	Success
+00:06:54	Super Heavy landing burn shutdown and catch	Success
+00:08:27	Starship engine cutoff (SECO)	Success
+00:48:03	Starship atmospheric reentry	Success
+01:02:34	Starship is transonic	—N/a
+01:03:43	Starship is subsonic	—N/a
+01:05:15	Starship landing flip	Success
+01:05:20	Starship landing burn	Success
+01:05:40	Starship splashdown	Success

== Reactions ==
NASA Administrator Bill Nelson praised the flight stating "Congratulations to SpaceX on its successful booster catch and fifth Starship flight test today!". Retired Canadian astronaut Chris Hadfield hailed the flight, declaring that "there was an enormous step forward in human capability today".

Fellow aerospace manufacturers also congratulated SpaceX including Blue Origin, Stoke Space, and Rocket Factory Augsburg, with the latter commending the company's "incredible feat of engineering" and commenting that at its current pace, the European space industry has "no chance" of catching up to SpaceX. André Loesekrug-Pietri, president of the Joint European Disruptive Initiative, made a similar statement, calling it "a huge slap in the face to the Europeans, who are leaving history".
