= Starship flight test 4 =

Fourth launch of SpaceX Starship

- Mission type: Suborbital flight test
- Operator: SpaceX
- Mission duration: 1 hour, 6 minutes, 10 seconds

Spacecraft properties
- Spacecraft: Starship Ship 29
- Spacecraft type: Starship
- Manufacturer: SpaceX

Start of mission
- Launch date: June 6, 2024, 7:50 am CDT (12:50 UTC)
- Rocket: Super Heavy (B11)
- Launch site: Starbase, OLP-1

End of mission
- Landing date: Booster: June 6, 2024, 7:57:24 am CDT (12:57:24 UTC); Spacecraft: June 6, 2024, 8:55:57 am CDT (13:55:57 UTC)
- Landing site: Super Heavy: Gulf of Mexico; Ship: Indian Ocean

Orbital parameters
- Regime: Suborbital
- Periapsis altitude: −15 km (−9.3 mi)
- Apoapsis altitude: 213 km (132 mi)
- Inclination: 26.8°
- Mission patch SpaceX Starship flight tests

Starship flight test 4 was the fourth flight test of the SpaceX Starship launch vehicle. SpaceX performed the flight test on June 6, 2024. The prototype vehicles flown were the Starship Ship 29 upper-stage and Super Heavy Booster 11.

The main test objectives of this flight, both of which were accomplished, were for the Super Heavy booster to simulate a landing at a "virtual tower" just above the surface of the Gulf of Mexico, and for Starship to survive at least peak heating during atmospheric re-entry.

This marked the first integrated test flight where both Starship and Super Heavy successfully reentered and performed a powered vertical landing over the ocean surface.

== Background ==
=== Investigation prior to launch ===
Starship flight test 3 in March 2024 attained full duration burns of both stages and reached orbital velocity. However, both stages were destroyed during atmospheric return, prompting a SpaceX-led mishap investigation overseen by the FAA. The FAA stated that a completed license modification, incorporating corrective actions and meeting other requirements, was required for a launch license to be granted for this flight, the fourth flight test.

SpaceX stated in early April that it would intend to attempt a booster landing with the tower arms on the fifth flight test if the booster virtual landing is successful during the fourth flight test. In late April, a NASA official confirmed SpaceX remained on track for the fourth test flight to occur in May 2024.

The communications license necessary for Flight 4 was granted by the FCC on April 18. On May 17, SpaceX asked that the FAA make a public safety determination regarding the third flight test, which would allow SpaceX to launch the test flight while the mishap investigation is in progress if determined there was no public safety danger. The FAA concluded the investigation on May 28 and determined that the third flight test had not threatened public safety. SpaceX received regulatory approval to launch from the FAA on June 4.

Starship flight test 4 was initially scheduled to launch on June 5, but was pushed back a day to June 6. For this fourth flight test, the FAA listed three specific outcomes that would not trigger a mishap-investigation: the ship burning up during reentry, the flaps not having sufficient control of the ship, or the Raptor 2 engines failing to relight for landing.

=== Vehicle ground testing ===
Booster 11 and Ship 29 were first spotted around August 2022. Both stages underwent multiple cryogenic proof tests in late 2023, with Ship 29 performing a spin prime test in March 2024. Following Starship's third test flight, Ship 29 was lifted onto Suborbital Pad B for two static fire tests in late March, and was later returned to the High Bay for pre-flight modifications. A 33-engine static-fire was conducted on Booster 11 on Orbital Launch Mount 1 on April 5. Booster 11's hot-staging ring was installed in early May. Ship 29 was lifted onto Booster 11 on May 15, followed by a partial propellant load test on May 16. A wet dress rehearsal (WDR) was conducted on May 20.

On May 28, SpaceX performed a second wet dress rehearsal of S29 and B11, and on May 30, SpaceX installed the flight termination system (FTS or AFSS) on B11 and S29. On June 5, S29 was stacked on top of B11 for the fourth and final time. SpaceX intentionally omitted two TPS (Thermal Protection System) tiles and replaced one with a thinner tile to test how the loss of tiles would affect the ship.

=== Changes from the previous flight ===
During Starship's third test flight, the booster was destroyed just before splashdown due to engine failures caused by filter blockage of liquid oxygen to the engines. The ship was destroyed during reentry, due to excessive roll rates caused by clogged roll control valves. As a result, modifications were made to Booster 11's oxygen tanks to improve propellant filtration capability, while hardware and software changes were implemented to improve Raptor startup reliability. Additional roll control thrusters were added to the ship to improve attitude control redundancy.

Several changes were spotted on Ship 29, including updates to the TPS tile adhesive and layout. B11 received upgrades such as reinforcements of tanks and additions to improve rigidity and durability. The largest horizontal tanks in the orbital tank farm were made operational, supplementing the older vertical tanks that were being retired. Suborbital Pad B was decommissioned in May 2024, and vehicle testing operations were moved to Massey's Test Site to make room for the construction of Orbital Launch Mount B.

== Flight ==
The mission profile for Starship flight test 4 was very similar to that of the third flight test, with the propellant transfer demonstration, the payload bay door demonstration, and the Raptor engine relight demonstration being omitted. There was also the addition of the jettisoning of the Super Heavy's hot staging ring two seconds after the shutdown of the boostback burn, and Starship was to attempt a landing flip and landing burn.

One of the 33 Raptor engines on Booster 11 failed to stay lit during the initial burn, and one of the thirteen used for the landing burn failed to light. Neither engine failure affected the outcome of the flight because of redundancy in the multiple-engine design. To reduce mass during descent, a temporary design change on this test flight was used to jettison the booster hot-staging ring. Longer term, the hot-staging ring is intended to be redesigned for lighter weight and tight integration with the booster and will not be jettisoned.

B11 successfully conducted a powered vertical landing over the Gulf of Mexico, splashing down into the ocean. The booster was destroyed after tipping over, and part of the engine section was recovered in September 2024. Bill Gerstenmaier stated that the booster landed "with half a centimeter accuracy."

After completing a full duration burn of all six engines, Ship 29 successfully re-entered the atmosphere, maintaining attitude control despite significant visible damage to the structure and flaps, and loss of some number of heat shield tiles. Following the hypersonic descent through the atmosphere, S29 performed a powered vertical landing above the ocean before splashing into the Indian Ocean. Elon Musk said that the ship maintained subsonic control but landed approximately 6 kilometers (3.7 mi) away from the target splashdown location.

=== Flight timeline ===
Time	Event	June 6, 2024
−01:15:00	Flight director conducts a poll and verifies go for propellant loading	Go for propellant loading
−00:49:00	Starship fuel (liquid methane) load start	Success
−00:47:00	Starship oxidizer (liquid oxygen) load start	Success
−00:40:00	Super Heavy fuel (liquid methane) load start	Success
−00:37:00	Super Heavy oxidizer (liquid oxygen) load start	Success
−00:19:40	Super Heavy and Starship engine chill	Success
−00:03:20	Starship propellant load complete	Success
−00:02:50	Super Heavy propellant load complete	Success
−00:00:30	Flight director verifies go for launch	Go for launch
−00:00:10	Flame deflector activation	Success
−00:00:03	Super Heavy engine ignition	Success
+00:00:02	Liftoff	Partial success 1 engine shut down at T+00:00:03
+00:01:02	Throttle down for max q during ascent (moment of peak mechanical stress on the rocket)	Success
+00:02:46	Super Heavy most engines cutoff (MECO)	Success
+00:02:51	Starship engine ignition and stage separation (hot-staging)	Success
+00:02:57	Super Heavy boostback burn start	Success
+00:03:47	Super Heavy boostback burn shutdown	Success
+00:04:04	Hot-stage jettison	Success
+00:07:04	Super Heavy is transonic	—N/a
+00:07:09	Super Heavy landing burn startup	Partial success 12 out of 13 engines ignited
+00:07:24	Super Heavy landing burn shutdown and splashdown	Success
+00:08:37	Starship engine cutoff (SECO)	Success
+00:44:54	Starship atmospheric reentry	Partial success Vehicle damaged on re-entry
+01:03:17	Starship is transonic	—N/a
+01:03:38	Starship is subsonic	—N/a
+01:05:36	Starship landing flip	Success
+01:05:39	Starship landing burn	Success
+01:05:56	Starship splashdown	Partial success Within the target area, but 6 km (3.7 mi) off center

== Reactions ==
The flight was hailed as a success and marked the first time the Super Heavy booster and Ship achieved controlled splashdowns. A FAA clause for Flight 4, which would allow SpaceX to continue with additional flights of the same profile without a mishap investigation as long as no public safety issues occurred, was upheld as the flight did not encounter a mishap outside of the three exceptions. On June 12, the FAA announced that they would not be requiring a mishap investigation for Flight 4 because all flight events occurred within the scope of planned and authorized activities. This was the first Starship flight test to not require an investigation.
