= Starship flight test 2 =

Second launch of SpaceX Starship

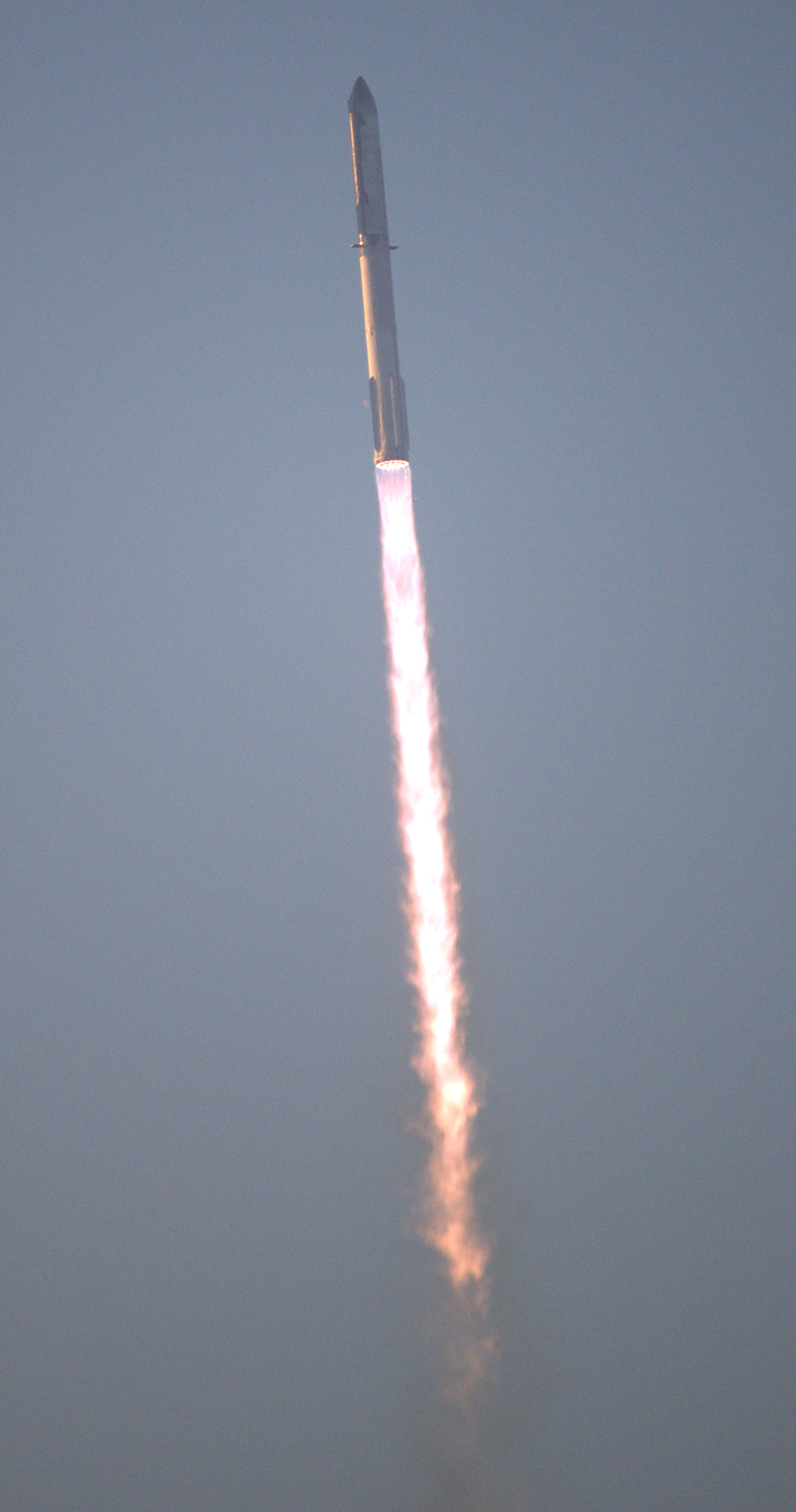
- Flight 2 vehicle ascent
- Names: Integrated Flight Test-2
- Mission type: Flight test
- Operator: SpaceX
- Mission duration: 8 minutes, 5 seconds (achieved); 90 minutes (planned)
- Orbits completed: 0 <1 (planned)

Spacecraft properties
- Spacecraft: Starship Ship 25
- Spacecraft type: Starship
- Manufacturer: SpaceX

Start of mission
- Launch date: November 18, 2023, 7:02:50 am CST (13:02:50 UTC)
- Rocket: Super Heavy (B9)
- Launch site: Starbase, OLP-1

End of mission
- Destroyed: November 18, 2023, 7:10:55 am CST (13:10:55 UTC)

Orbital parameters
- Regime: Transatmospheric Earth orbit (planned)
- Periapsis altitude: -1,750 km (1,090 mi) (achieved); 50 km (31 mi) (planned)
- Apoapsis altitude: 149 km (93 mi) (achieved)
- Inclination: 26.5°
- Mission patch SpaceX Starship flight tests

Video of the launch

Starship flight test 2 was the second flight test of the SpaceX Starship launch vehicle. SpaceX performed the flight test on November 18, 2023. The mission's primary objectives were for the vehicle to hot stage—a new addition to Starship's flight profile—followed by the second stage attaining a near-orbital trajectory with a controlled reentry over the Pacific Ocean, while the booster does a boostback burn with a propulsive splashdown in the Gulf of Mexico.

The vehicle successfully lifted off under the power of all 33 Raptor engines on the Super Heavy Booster and made it through stage separation. The booster was planned to land on the Gulf of Mexico, but experienced multiple engine failures and exploded during its boostback burn. The Starship second stage continued to accelerate for over 8 minutes, reaching an altitude of 149 km (93 mi). Towards the end of the second stage burn the Ship vented excess liquid oxygen, resulting in a fire in its aft section and loss of the vehicle.

The Federal Aviation Administration issued a statement confirming that an anomaly had occurred and that there were no reports of public property damage or injuries. The Federal Communications Commission considered the launch as a failure and used this as a rationale for rejecting SpaceX's Starlink service as eligible for large US rural broadband internet subsidies. Shortly after the launch, SpaceX made a statement on their website saying that "success comes from what we learn" from a "test like this".

== Background ==
After the first test flight in April 2023, which ended in the destruction of the entire Starship vehicle, significant work was done on the launch mount to repair the damage it sustained during the test and to prevent future issues.

Meanwhile, the Federal Aviation Administration (FAA) required SpaceX to conduct an investigation on the mishap, grounding Starship pending the outcome of their investigation. The FAA closed the investigation on September 8, 2023. The FWS fully concluded its environmental review on November 14, and the FAA gave its full approval for launch shortly after.

=== Investigation prior to launch ===
==== FAA investigation ====
Following Starship's first flight failure, the Federal Aviation Administration (FAA) required SpaceX to conduct an investigation on the mishap, grounding Starship pending the outcome of their investigation. The FAA would oversee the investigation, a standard practice when a vehicle was lost in flight. The agency grounded Starship flights during the investigation, also a standard practice, and said that "a return to flight of the Starship/Super Heavy vehicle is based on the FAA determining that any system, process or procedure related to the mishap does not affect public safety" and that there were no reports of injuries or public property damage. The FAA also announced that it would monitor the cleanup, which included the standard removal of launch debris from "sensitive habitats". On May 15, SpaceX filed a request for FCC approval for a second flight between June 15 and December 15, using Booster 9 and Ship 25. In August, SpaceX submitted an initial mishap report to the FAA for review and approval.

The FAA stated in September 2023

Following the launch, the FAA [...] required SpaceX to conduct a mishap investigation in accordance with its approved mishap plan under FAA oversight. The FAA conducted a final review of the mishap report, dated August 21, 2023 . The primary focus of this review was to ensure [...] the identification of root cause(s) and implementation of corrective actions to avoid a recurrence of the event. The FAA has been provided with sufficient information and accepts the root causes and corrective actions described in the mishap report. Consequently, the FAA considers the mishap investigation that SpaceX was required to complete to be concluded. The final mishap investigation report [submitted by SpaceX in August, as part of the investigation conducted by SpaceX and required by the FAA] cited a total of sixty-three (63) corrective actions for SpaceX to implement. These included actions to address redesigns of vehicle hardware to prevent leaks and fires, redesign of the launch pad to increase its robustness, incorporation of additional reviews in the design process, additional analysis and testing of safety critical.

Following SpaceX's final report, the FAA closed the investigation on September 8, 2023. In the same statement, FAA officials emphasized that "The closure of the mishap investigation does not signal an immediate resumption of Starship launches at Boca Chica." And that SpaceX first had to "implement all corrective actions that impact public safety" and applied for a "license modification from the FAA" that addresses the FAA's "safety and other environmental regulatory requirements". The FAA also announced that the full investigatory report would not be released due to confidential contents including export control information.

Prior to Starship's second flight, SpaceX's vice president and ex-NASA engineer Bill Gerstenmaier made statements at the U.S. Senate on the importance of innovation in light of "strategic competition from state actors like China". He said SpaceX was under a contract with NASA to use Starship to land American astronauts on the moon before China does, and that the Starship test flights campaign was being held up by "regulatory headwinds and unnecessary bureaucracy" unrelated to public safety.

==== FWS review ====
By September 2023, the Fish and Wildlife Service (FWS) had not yet started a formal review of SpaceX's modifications, and based on the 135 day review period, the launch could have been postponed to NET 2024. The Federal Aviation Administration received the final biological assessment from the FWS. William H. Gerstenmaier, SpaceX's Vice President of Build and Flight Reliability, called on the FAA to increase licensing staff. On October 19, 2023, the FWS surveyed the area around Starbase and the consultation with the FAA has been extended into November. The FWS reviewed the changes to the launch pad, especially the water deluge system. By October 31, 2023, the FAA had concluded the safety review portion of the launch license.

=== Changes from the previous flight ===
After the first test flight in April 2023 ended in the destruction of the Starship vehicle, significant work was done on the launch mount to repair the damage it sustained during the test and to prevent future issues. The foundation of the launch tower was reinforced and a steel water deluge flame deflector was built under the launch mount. Ship 25 was rolled to the suborbital launch site in May 2023 and underwent spin prime and static fire testing ahead of flight. Once that was completed, Booster 9 was rolled to the launch site to undergo cryogenic proof testing, spin primes and static fires of its set of engines. By November 15, 2023, Ship 25 was stacked onto B9 for launch.

On November 14, 2023, the United States Fish and Wildlife Service (FWS) concluded its environmental review. The Federal Aviation Administration (FAA) granted the flight its launch license on November 15, 2023.

Significant changes implemented by SpaceX compared to the previous flight include an expansion of the Super Heavy's fire suppression system in order to mitigate any potential engine bay fires. SpaceX re-qualified their autonomous flight safety system, which had malfunctioned during the first flight.

Other changes unrelated to the previous flights include a hot stage separation system in which Starship's second-stage engines ignite while Starship is still attached to the booster, pushing the two apart. SpaceX replaced the hydraulic systems of Super Heavy Raptor engines with thrust vector control driven by electric motors, citing fewer potential points of failure and more energy efficiency.

The orbital launch mount and pad systems were reinforced in a way that, according to SpaceX, should prevent a recurrence of the pad foundation failure observed during the first flight test. SpaceX also added, and tested, a flame deflector for the launchpad.

== Flight profile ==
The spacecraft flight plan was to lift off from SpaceX's Starbase facility along the south Texas coast, then conduct a partial orbit around Earth. The Super Heavy had a planned boostback burn followed by a soft water landing in the Gulf of Mexico, similarly to a Falcon 9 performing a return to launch site landing (RTLS). The Starship spacecraft was then to re-enter the atmosphere and perform a water landing in the Pacific Ocean near Hawaii, without performing a landing burn.

=== Flight timeline ===
Time	Event	November 18, 2023
−02:00:00	Flight director conducts a poll and verifies go for propellant loading	Go for propellant loading
−01:37:00	Super Heavy propellant (liquid oxygen and liquid methane) load start	Success
−01:17:00	Starship fuel (liquid methane) load start	Success
−01:13:00	Starship oxidizer (liquid oxygen) load start	Success
−00:19:40	Booster engine chill	Success
−00:00:10	Flame deflector (water deluge system) activation	Success
−00:00:03	Booster engine ignition	Success
+00:00:02	Liftoff	Success
+00:00:52	Throttle down for max q during ascent (moment of peak mechanical stress on the rocket)	Success
+00:02:39	Booster most engines cutoff (MECO)	Success
+00:02:41	Starship engine ignition and stage separation (hot-staging)	Success
+00:02:53	Booster boostback burn startup	Partial failure 9/10 engines were initially relit
+00:03:47	Booster boostback shutdown	Failure; During the boostback burn, a LOX filter blockage occurred and resulted in progressive engine failures which led to the destruction of the booster at T+3:21
+00:06:18	Booster is transonic	—N/a
+00:06:30	Booster landing burn startup	—N/a
+00:06:48	Booster landing burn shutdown	—N/a
+00:08:33	Starship engine cutoff (SECO)	Failure; At T+7:05, a planned vent of liquid oxygen caused onboard fires. This led to a loss of communication between the flight computers, shutdown of all engines, and ultimately triggered the flight termination system
+01:17:21	Starship atmospheric re-entry interface	—N/a
+01:28:43	Starship is transonic	—N/a
+01:30:00	Starship Pacific impact	—N/a

== Launch analysis ==
On November 11, 2023, SpaceX announced that they were targeting a launch date of November 17, pending regulatory approval. On November 14, the FWS concluded its environmental review, and the FAA gave its approval for launch. On November 16, the flight was delayed one day, due to a grid fin actuator needing to be replaced on B9.

The first launch attempt of the second integrated flight test occurred on November 18 at 13:02 UTC (7:02 a.m. CST). Booster 9 and Ship 25 lifted off the pad. The rocket encountered maximum aerodynamic stress (Max q) with no anomalies reported. Starship executed a successful separation, powering down all but three of Super Heavy’s Raptor engines and successfully igniting the six second stage Raptor engines before separating the vehicles.

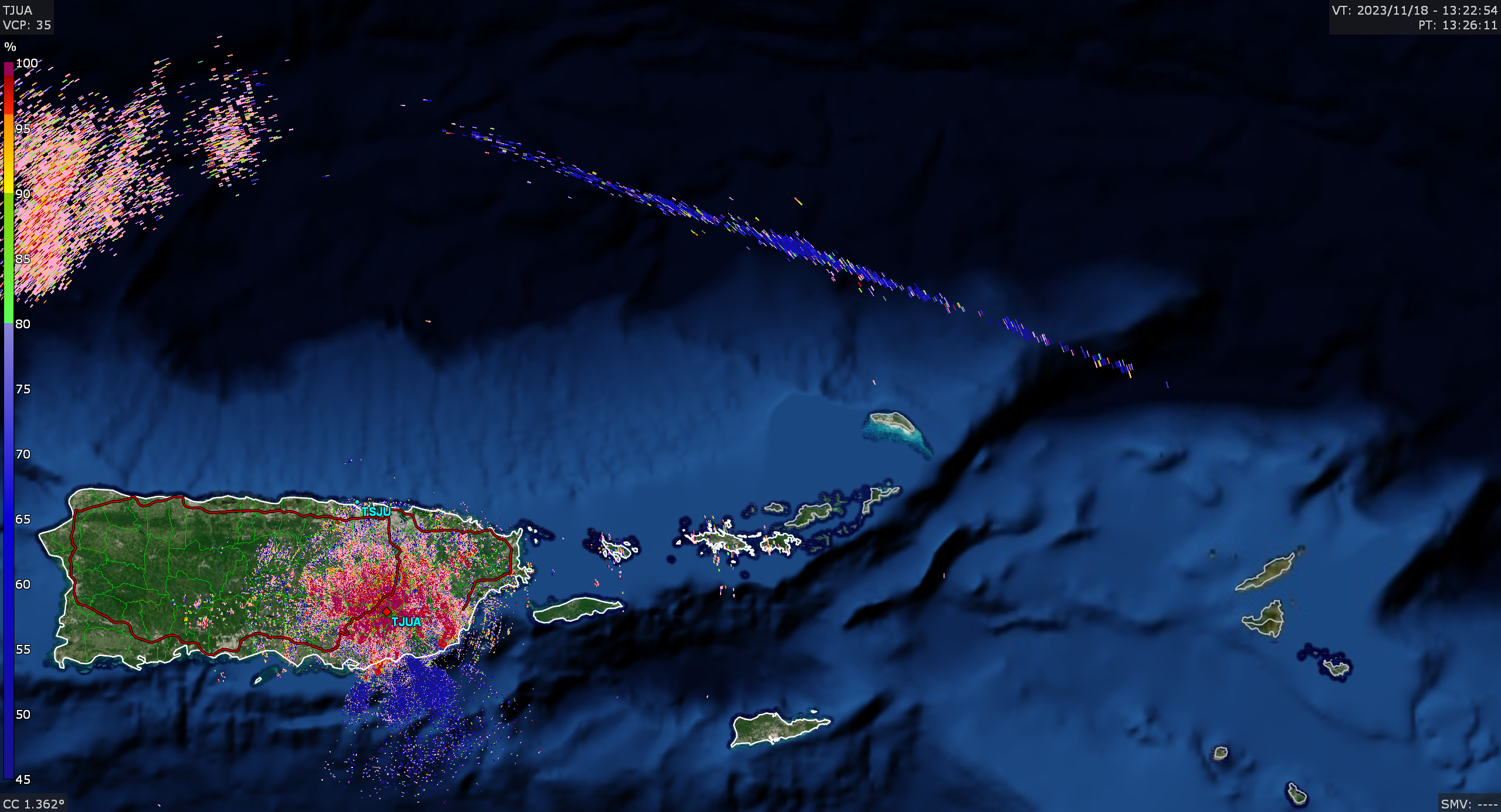
The debris from SpaceX Ship 25 re-entering the atmosphere after the explosion as seen on the National Weather Service's radar's correlation coefficient

Following stage separation, Super Heavy initiated its flip maneuver, and then its boostback burn: the flight computers sent commands to 13 of the vehicle’s 33 Raptor engines to propel the rocket toward its intended landing location. During this burn, several engines began shutting down before one engine failed, leading to the explosion of the booster. The Super Heavy vehicle breakup occurred over three and a half minutes into the flight at an altitude of ~90 km over the Gulf of Mexico. All Starship's six second stage Raptor engines powered the vehicle to an altitude of 148 km, above common boundaries of space, and a velocity of ~24,000 km/h, becoming the first Starship to reach outer space and nearly completing its full-duration burn.

Near the end of Starship's second stage burn, after over eight minutes of flight and prior to engine cutoff, telemetry was lost. SpaceX said that a safe command destroyed the second stage prior to achieving its planned orbit or attempting re-entry. According to astronomer Jonathan McDowell, at his predicted re-entry point, NOAA weather radar picked up a debris cloud a few hundred miles north of the Virgin Islands.

In January 2024, SpaceX said that because Starship carried no payload, they planned to vent excess liquid oxygen from the second stage near the end of the burn. The venting of that oxygen led to a fire and explosion. Elon Musk echoed the assessment, writing: "Flight 2 actually almost made it to orbit ... If it had a payload, it would have made it to orbit because the reason that it actually didn’t quite make it to orbit was we vented the liquid oxygen."

Upon the FAA's closure of the investigation on February 26, SpaceX elaborated on the cause of the accident thusly: At vehicle separation, Starship’s upper stage lit all six Raptor engines and flew a normal ascent until approximately seven minutes into the flight, when a planned vent of excess liquid oxygen propellant began. Additional propellant had been loaded on the spacecraft as a payload simulant and needed to be disposed of prior to reentry to meet required propellant mass targets at splashdown.

A leak in the aft section of the spacecraft that developed when the liquid oxygen vent was initiated resulted in a combustion event and subsequent fires that led to a loss of communication between the spacecraft’s flight computers. This resulted in a commanded shutdown of all six engines prior to completion of the ascent burn, followed by the Autonomous Flight Safety System detecting a mission rule violation and performing flight termination, leading to vehicle breakup at an altitude of ~150 km and a velocity of ~24,000 km/h, becoming the first Starship to reach outer space.

On the booster's fate, SpaceX stated that the most likely root cause was filter blockages where liquid oxygen is supplied to the engines, leading to a loss of inlet pressure in the engines' oxidizer turbopumps that eventually resulted in one engine failing in such a manner that it resulted in the loss of the vehicle. This led SpaceX to implement hardware changes inside the booster oxidizer tanks related to propellant filtration and reliability.

== Aftermath ==
SpaceX and Cameron County reopened the road to the launch site a few hours after the launch. This was noted by CNN as a faster reopening than during the first flight attempt, when it remained closed for two days. NASA administrator Bill Nelson congratulated the teams involved in the test flight, and retired Canadian astronaut Chris Hadfield called it a "very successful 2nd test flight" in a post on Twitter. SpaceX considered the mission a success.

Elon Musk later stated that the water deluge would not require any refurbishment for Starship flight test 3. According to SpaceX, the water-cooled flame deflector and other pad upgrades performed as expected, requiring minimal post-launch work to be ready for upcoming vehicle tests and the next integrated flight test.

In December 2023 the Federal Communications Commission issued final denial of an $885 million Starlink subsidy because all attempted Starship launches "have failed".

At the time of the [Commission's Wireline Competition] Bureau's decision, Starship had not yet been launched. Indeed, even as of today [i.e. over a year later], Starship has not yet had a successful launch; all of its attempted launches have failed. Based on Starlink’s previous assertions about its plans to launch its second-generation satellites via Starship, and the information that was available at the time, the [Wireline Competition] Bureau necessarily considered Starlink’s continuing inability to successfully launch the Starship rocket when making predictive judgment about its ability to meet its RDOF obligations.

17 significant changes were made to the Starship vehicle, including upgrading the ship to an electric thrust-vector control system and delaying the ship LOX dump to after SECO.

SpaceX said the water-cooled flame deflector and other pad upgrades made after Starship’s first flight test had performed as expected, requiring "minimal post-launch work to be ready for vehicle tests and the next integrated flight test".

Following the flight test, SpaceX said it had led the investigation efforts with oversight from the FAA and participation from NASA, and the National Transportation Safety Board.
