= SpaceX Starship (spacecraft) =

Reusable spacecraft under development by SpaceX

Starship
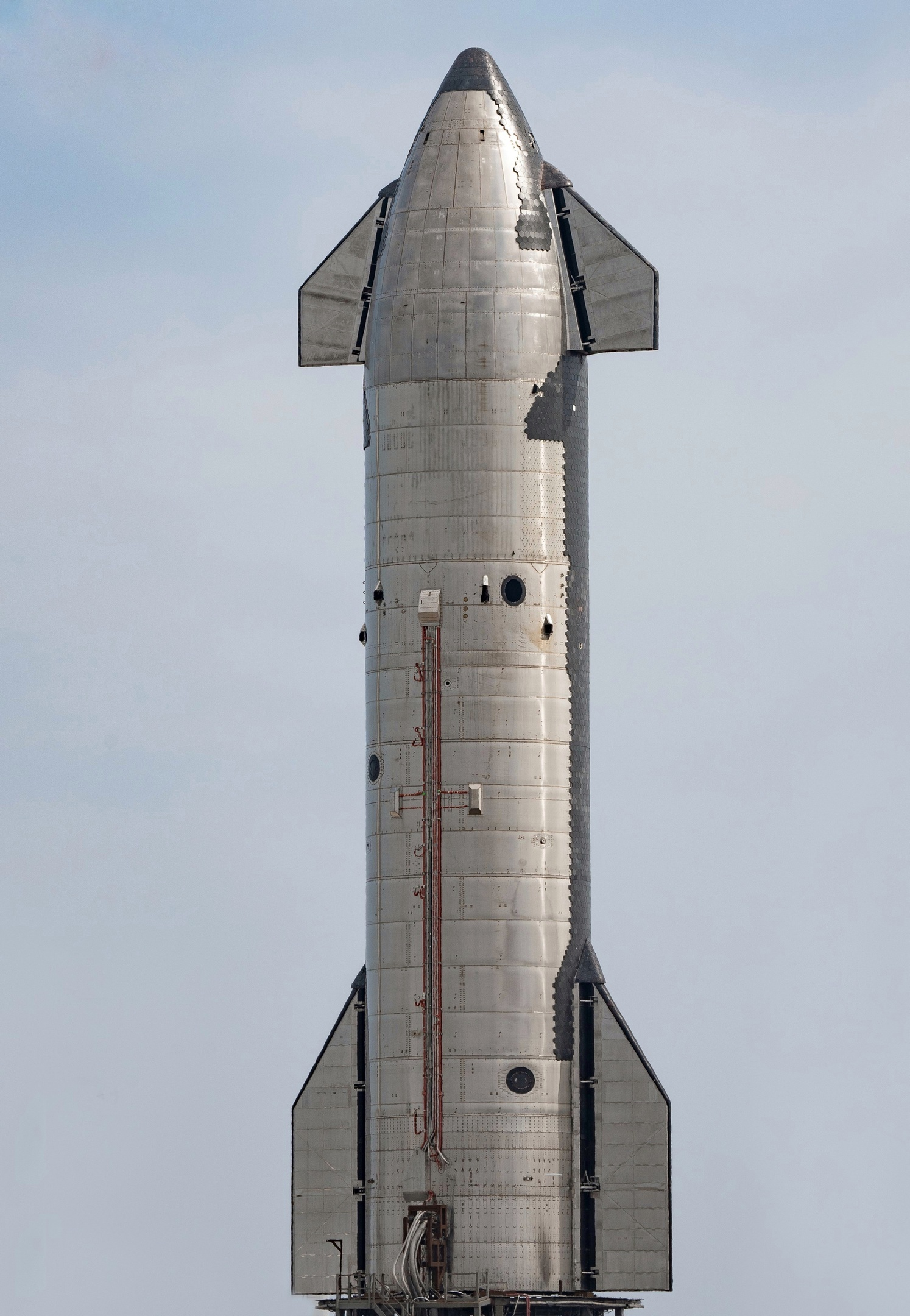
- Starship prototype SN20 at the launch site; the distinctive stainless steel structure is visible as well as the edges of the dark thermal protection tiles that cover the windward side of the vehicle.
- Manufacturer: SpaceX
- Country of origin: United States
- Operator: SpaceX
- Applications: Crew and cargo interplanetary transport; Refueling operations; Point-to-point transport on Earth
- Website: spacex.com/vehicles/starship

Specifications
- Spacecraft type: Crewed, reusable
- Payload capacity: 200,000 kg (440,000 lb) (planned)
- Crew capacity: Up to 100 (planned)
- Volume: 614 m^{3} (21,700 cu ft)
- Wingspan: 17 m (56 ft)

Production
- Status: Active
- Launched: 15
- Retired: 3
- Failed: 5: Block 1: 2 (FT 2, FT 3); Block 2: 3 (FT 7, FT 8, FT 9)
- Lost: 1: Block 1: 1 (FT 1); Block 2: 0
- Maiden launch: 20 April 2023

Related spacecraft
- Derivatives: Starship HLS
- Flown with: SpaceX Super Heavy
Stage info
Second stage – Starship
Height	Block 1: 50.3 m (165 ft); Block 2: 52.1 m (171 ft)
Diameter	9 m (30 ft)
Empty mass	Block 1: ~100 t (220,000 lb); Block 2: 85 t (187,000 lb)
Gross mass	Block 1: ~1,300 t (2,900,000 lb); Block 2: 1,585 t (3,494,000 lb); (Note: Gross mass is the total of the propellant mass (1,200,000 kg) and approximate empty mass (100,000 kg).)
Propellant mass	Block 1: 1,200 t (2,600,000 lb); Block 2: 1,500 t (3,300,000 lb)
Powered by	3 × Raptor engines; 3 × Raptor vacuum engines
Maximum thrust	12,300 kN (2,800,000 lb_{f})
Specific impulse	SL: 327 s (3.21 km/s); vac: 380 s (3.7 km/s)
Propellant	CH_{4} / LOX

Starship (or colloquially the Ship) is a spacecraft and second stage under development by American aerospace company SpaceX. Stacked atop its booster, Super Heavy, the pair compose SpaceX's super heavy-lift space vehicle, also called Starship. The spacecraft is designed to transport both passengers and cargo to a variety of destinations, including Earth orbit, the Moon, and Mars. It is designed to be reusable and capable of landing propulsively by firing its engines to perform a controlled descent into the arms of a tower on Earth or with landing legs on other planetary bodies. It is intended to enable long-duration interplanetary flights with up to 100 passengers. It is also claimed by SpaceX to be capable of enabling travel to anywhere on Earth in under an hour. Furthermore, it has been proposed to be used to refuel other Starship spacecraft, enabling them to reach higher orbits and other space destinations. Elon Musk, the CEO of SpaceX, estimated in a tweet that eight launches would be needed to completely refuel a Starship in low Earth orbit. However, some estimates include as many as twenty refueling flights.

Development began in 2012, when Musk described a plan to build a reusable launch vehicle with substantially greater capabilities than the Falcon 9 and the planned Falcon Heavy. The rocket evolved through many design and name changes. On July 25, 2019, the Starhopper prototype performed the first successful flight at SpaceX Starbase near Boca Chica, Texas. In May 2021, the SN15 prototype became the first full-size test spacecraft to take off and land successfully. On April 20, 2023, Starship 24 performed the first full flight test on top of a Super Heavy booster, followed by a second test on November 18, 2023, when Starship 25 successfully completed hot staging and passed the Kármán line, becoming the first Starship to reach space as well as the heaviest object to ever reach space, before exploding at 148 km. In April 2024, Elon Musk announced two new versions of Starship, Block 2 and Block 3. Both versions would be taller, and have increased thrust. As of November 2026 SpaceX had conducted 15 flight tests of Starship, successfully achieving orbital velocities and gradually testing the atmospheric reentry and vertical landing capabilities of the vehicle by first performing controlled splashdowns into the Indian Ocean and most recently a landing caught by the launch tower.

== Design ==
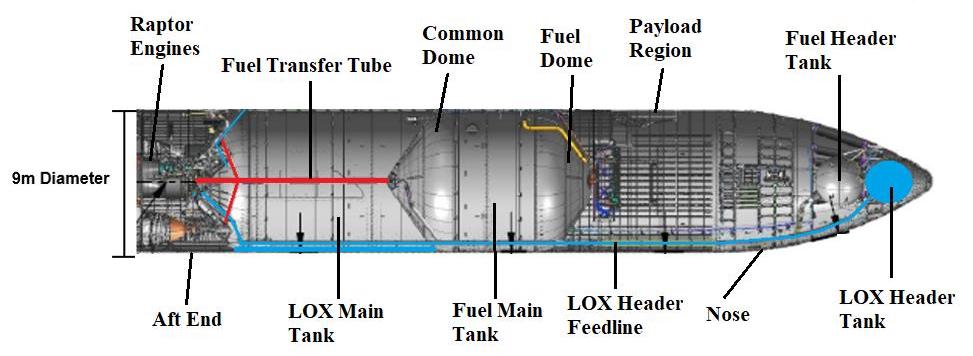
Diagram of a Block 1 Starship's internal structure. Not shown in this diagram are the flaps: the aft flaps are placed at the bottom (or left in this orientation), and the forward flaps are placed at the top (here, right) portion of the vehicle.

The now retired Block 2 version of Starship was 52.1 m (171 ft) tall, 9 m (30 ft) wide, and was composed of four general sections: the engine bay, the oxygen tank, the fuel tank, and the payload bay. The retired Block 1 was constructed in a similar manner, though it was only 50.3 m (165 ft) tall. Elon Musk stated in 2021 that the vehicle had a dry mass of roughly 100 t (220,000 lb). The windward side is protected by a heat shield composed of eighteen thousand hexagonal black tiles that can withstand temperatures of 1,400 °C (2,600 °F). It is designed to protect the vehicle during atmospheric entry and is to be used multiple times with minimal maintenance between flights. The silica-based tiles are attached to Starship with pins, and had small gaps in between to allow for heat expansion. After flight test 4, SpaceX added a secondary ablative layer under the primary heat shield, though this was only added to the flaps of the flight test 6 vehicle. This ablative layer is likely composed of pyron, which is similar in composition to carbon composites. The total mass of the heat shield and ablative layer of a Block 1 ship is 10.5 t (23,000 lb). After flight test 10, SpaceX added a felt, called "crunch wrap," between the gaps in between the tiles to prevent heat seeping in.

=== Tanks ===
The propellant tanks on Starship are separated by a common bulkhead, similar to the ones used on the S-II and S-IVB stages on the Saturn V rocket. While Block 2 vehicles use an elliptical dome, the common and forward domes of the Block 1 design were more conical. Block 1 vehicles only had 24 stringers within the oxygen tank, while Block 2 vehicles had these added to the methane tanks. The vehicle's tanks hold 1,500 t (3,300,000 lb) of propellant, consisting of 1,170 t (2,580,000 lb) of liquid oxygen and 330 t (730,000 lb) of liquid methane. (Note: 78% of 1,500 t (3,300,000 lb) is 1,170 t (2,580,000 lb) of liquid oxygen.)

Fuel is fed to the engines via four downcomers, with three smaller downcomers feeding the Vacuum Raptors/RVacs and the central downcomer feeding the inner three engines. The central downcomer connects to a large sump, instead of directly to the methane tank. The original design had a single downcomer. The liquid oxygen (LOX) downcomer extends into the LOX tank, with a small expanded portion of unknown purpose. Two additional downcomers route methane and oxygen from the header tanks. A camera is located on the walls of the tank, pointed towards the payload bay.

The oxygen tank terminates with the thrust structure of the vehicle. The RVac engines are mounted directly to the aft dome, which has reinforcements mounted inside of the tank. The three sea level engines are mounted on the thrust puck, which forms the bottom of the aft dome. A conical steel structure is mounted inside the bottom of the dome, reinforcing the thrust puck enough to enable its support of the inner three engines. The propellant lines on the vehicles are vacuum jacketed, reducing boiloff while in orbit.

=== Propulsion ===
Starship is powered by six Raptor engines, which are housed within a dedicated shielding compartment. Blocks 1 through 3 have three sea-level engines, as well as three engines optimized for operation in the vacuum of space, called RVacs. Block 4 ships are expected to have three additional RVacs. The sea-level engines are equipped with gimbal actuators, and reignite for the landing burns. After Starship's second flight test, this gimbaling system was switched from a hydraulic system to an electric one, enabling the removal of the hydraulic power units. This change was made to the booster after the first flight test. There are four engine chill lines on board the vehicle, though two of these lines may serve another purpose.

Each engine is protected by a dedicated shielding compartment. Beginning with S25, the Block 1 design had between 14 and 16 such vents. Additional vents were added after flight 7. The fire suppression system, which uses gaseous nitrogen to purge the engine bay during flight, was upgraded after flight 7. A similar system on the booster uses carbon dioxide to purge the individual engine compartments during flight and static fires.

The Raptor engine uses a full-flow staged combustion cycle, which has oxygen and methane-rich turbopumps. Before 2014, only two full-flow staged-combustion rocket engine designs had advanced enough to undergo testing: the Soviet RD-270 project in the 1960s and the Aerojet Rocketdyne Integrated Powerhead Demonstrator in the mid-2000s. To improve performance, the engines burn supercooled propellant.

The Block 1 version of the ship (used through November 2024) produced a total of 12.25 MN (2,750,000 lb_{f}) almost triple the thrust of the Saturn V second stage, with this being expected to increase to 15.69 MN (3,530,000 lb_{f}) for Block 2 boosters and later up to 26.48 MN (5,950,000 lb_{f}) with the Block 3 vehicle.

During unpowered flight in orbit, control authority is provided by cold gas thrusters fed with residual ullage gas. Four such thrusters are located just below the payload bay, and two on the oxygen tank. Near the top of the nosecone, there are two vents connected to the header tanks. Additional vents were added at the base of the vehicle after flight two.

=== Payload bay ===
The payload bay hosts the nosecone, header tanks, forward flaps, multiple COPVs, and the so-called "PEZ dispenser". The header tanks are mounted at the tip of the payload bay. The LOX header tank forms the top of the nosecone, with the methane header tank attached directly below it. These tanks terminate in a conical sump, which are attached to the downcomers. Several COPVs are mounted in the space around the methane header tank, providing the startup gas for the engines, with twelve additional COPVs within the base of the payload bay.

The nosecone has substantial internal reinforcement, mainly around the forward flap attachment points and lifting points for the chopsticks. The number of internal stringers was increased between Block 1 and Block 2 vehicles. Additional reinforcements are used to support the PEZ dispenser on ships equipped with one. Four Starlink antennas are located within the nosecone.

The PEZ dispenser is used to deploy Starlink satellites into LEO. It was first added to S24, though it was permanently sealed until flight 3. It consists of the dispenser mechanism and the door. The door opens by folding into the payload bay.

The dispenser itself is mounted directly to the forward dome. It has a truss structure for its base, with solid steel used elsewhere. A mobile track is used in the base, enabling the dispenser to push the satellite out of the vehicle. After dispensing a satellite, the next payload is lowered onto the base, and is deployed. The opposite occurs during loading, with the dispenser raising its payloads to receive another satellite. In order to prevent the satellite from floating out of the mechanism during zero-g operations, the dispenser locks the satellites in position using a "retention frame". This is lowered alongside the satellites during operation.

=== Flaps ===
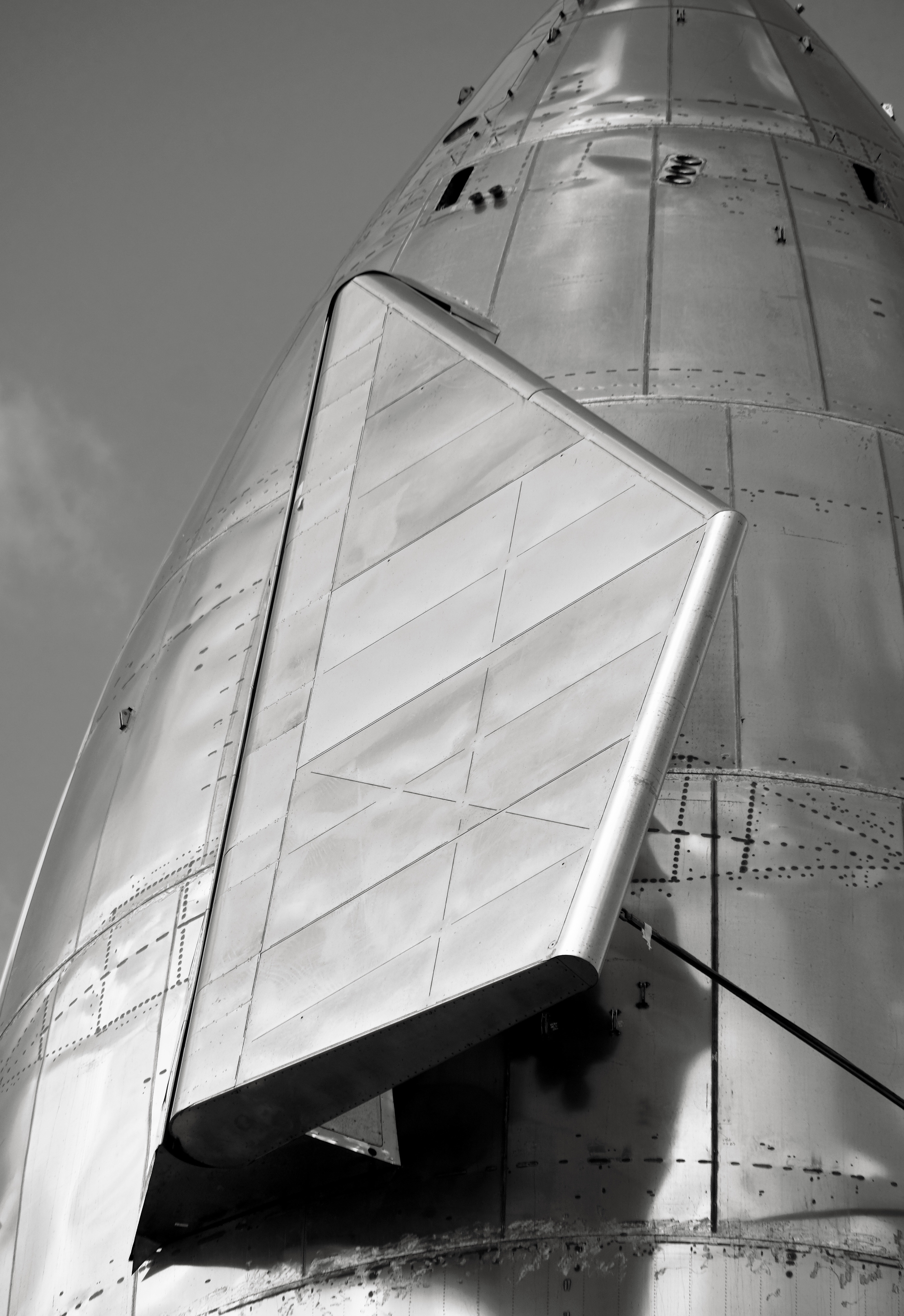
Forward flap on a suborbital Starship prototype

Starship controls its reentry with four flaps, two aft flaps mounted to the sides of the engine bay and LOX tank and two forward flaps on the payload bay. Substantial reinforcements are present in the nosecone for the support of the forward flaps. According to SpaceX, the flaps replace the need for wings or tailplane, reduce the fuel needed for landing, and allow landing at destinations in the Solar System where runways do not exist (for example, Mars). The flap's hinges are sealed in aerocovers because they would otherwise be easily damaged during reentry. Static wicks are present on the flaps, aiding in the discharge of static electricity.

Despite this, damage to the forward flaps was observed on flights four, five, and six, with near complete loss occurring on flight 4. Beginning with Block 2, the design of these forward flaps was significantly changed, moving leeward and becoming thinner and angled. This sets them at an approximately 140-degree angle, compared to the 180-degree angle of the aft flaps and previous version of the forward flaps. This change was made to prevent the static aero from creating a tendency for the Ship to pitch up, even when the forward flaps were stowed, and also reduces the heating on the static aero and forward flaps observed on the last three flights of the Block 1 ship. Both sets of flaps feature cameras in their hinges.

== Manufacturing ==
The manufacturing process starts with rolls of 301 stainless steel, which are unrolled, cut, and welded along an edge to create a cylinder of 9 m (30 ft) diameter, 1.83 m (6.00 ft) tall, and 3.97 mm (0.156 in) thick, and approximately 1600 kg (3,600 lb) in mass. (Note: This is based on the dimensions of the ring and 304L stainless steel's density of 7.93 g/cm^{3}.) Twenty-one such rings are used in the Starship spacecraft.

These rings are stacked and robotically welded along their edges to form stacks of three to five rings in the Starfactory. Following this, the domes are installed within the forward, aft, and common ring stacks. Cutouts are made for the header tank downcomers in the forward dump, a sump is added to the common dome, and the aft dome is integrated with the thrust puck. Heat tile pins are added to the ring stacks, along with the secondary thermal protection system. Following this, the thermal protection system's tiles are attached.

The nosecone is assembled from two different segments. The header tanks are inserted into the tip of the nosecone, as well as the motors and structural frames for the forward flaps. Heat shield tiles are added at this stage.

The segments are stacked vertically, beginning with the nosecone being lowered onto the payload bay. This process continues until the vehicle is integrated with the aft barrel, completing the structure of the vehicle. Following this, the aft flaps are installed.

The vehicle is then rolled to the Massey's test site, where it is cryogenically tested. These tests fill both tanks with liquid nitrogen, which is nonflammable, while pressing on the thrust puck to simulate the raptor engines. After returning to the production site, the engines are installed. It is static fired at Massey's, and then is rolled to the launch site for flight.

== Variants ==
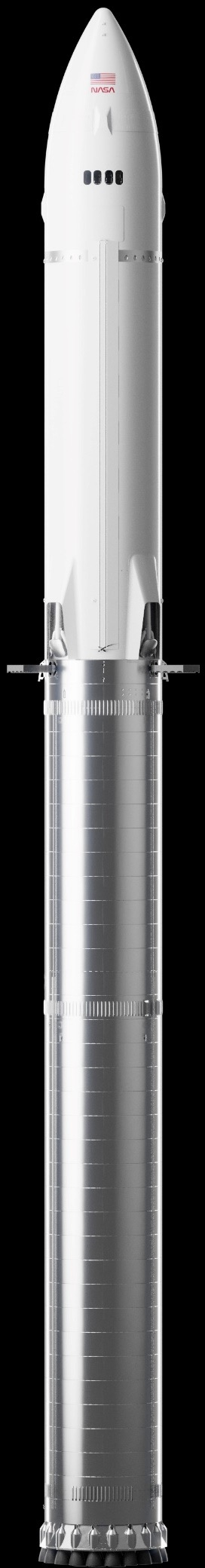
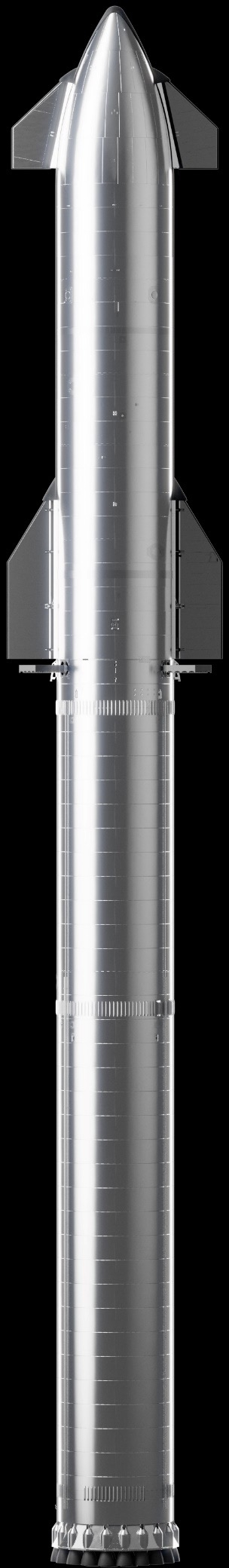
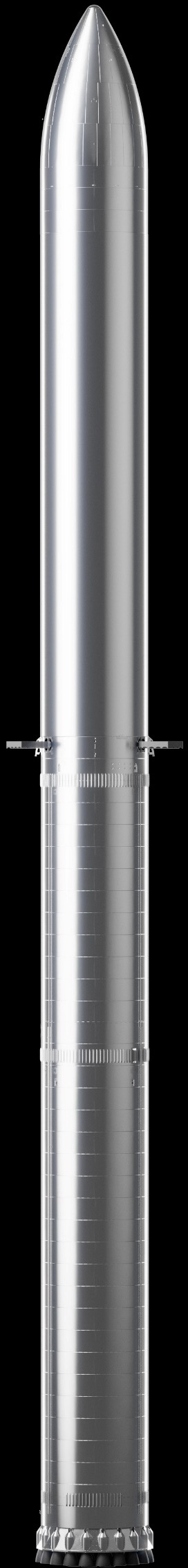
Starship stacks with 3 upper stage variants: HLS, propellant tanker and propellant depot. The vented interstage, located between the Starship spacecraft and Super Heavy booster, is not included in this render.

For a non-Starlink satellite launch, Starship is planned to have a large cargo door that opens to release payloads, similar to NASA's Space Shuttle, and closes upon reentry instead of a jettisonable nosecone fairing. Instead of a cleanroom, payloads are integrated directly into Starship's payload bay, which requires purging the payload bay with temperature-controlled ISO class 8 clean air.

Crewed Starship vehicles would replace the cargo bay with a pressurized crew section and have a life-support system. For long-duration missions, such as crewed flights to Mars, SpaceX describes the interior as potentially including "private cabins, large communal areas, centralized storage, solar storm shelters, and a viewing gallery". Starship's life support system is expected to recycle resources such as air and water from waste.

Starship has been proposed to be able to refuel by docking with separately launched Starship propellant tanker spacecraft in orbit. If this concept proves successful, it could potentially increase the spacecraft's mass capacity, theoretically allowing it to reach higher-energy targets. As of 2025 this concept has not been demonstrated. Some proposed missions that would require this in-space refueling include: geosynchronous orbit, the Moon, and Mars. A Starship propellant depot orbiting Earth could cache methane and oxygen on-orbit and be used by Starship to replenish its fuel tanks.

Starship Human Landing System (HLS) is a crewed lunar lander variant of the Starship vehicle that would be modified for landing, operation, and takeoff from the lunar surface. It would have landing legs, a body-mounted solar array, a set of thrusters mounted mid-body to assist with final landing and takeoff, two airlocks, and an elevator to lower crew and cargo onto the lunar surface.

Varying estimates have been given about the number of tanker launches required to fully fuel HLS, ranging from between "four and eight" to a number "in the high teens". These launches will reportedly have to be in "rapid succession" in order to manage schedule constraints and cryogenic fuel boil-off. When fully fueled, Starship HLS is designed to land 100 t (220,000 lb) of payload on the Moon.

== History ==
=== Early concepts ===
==== Mars Colonial Transporter ====
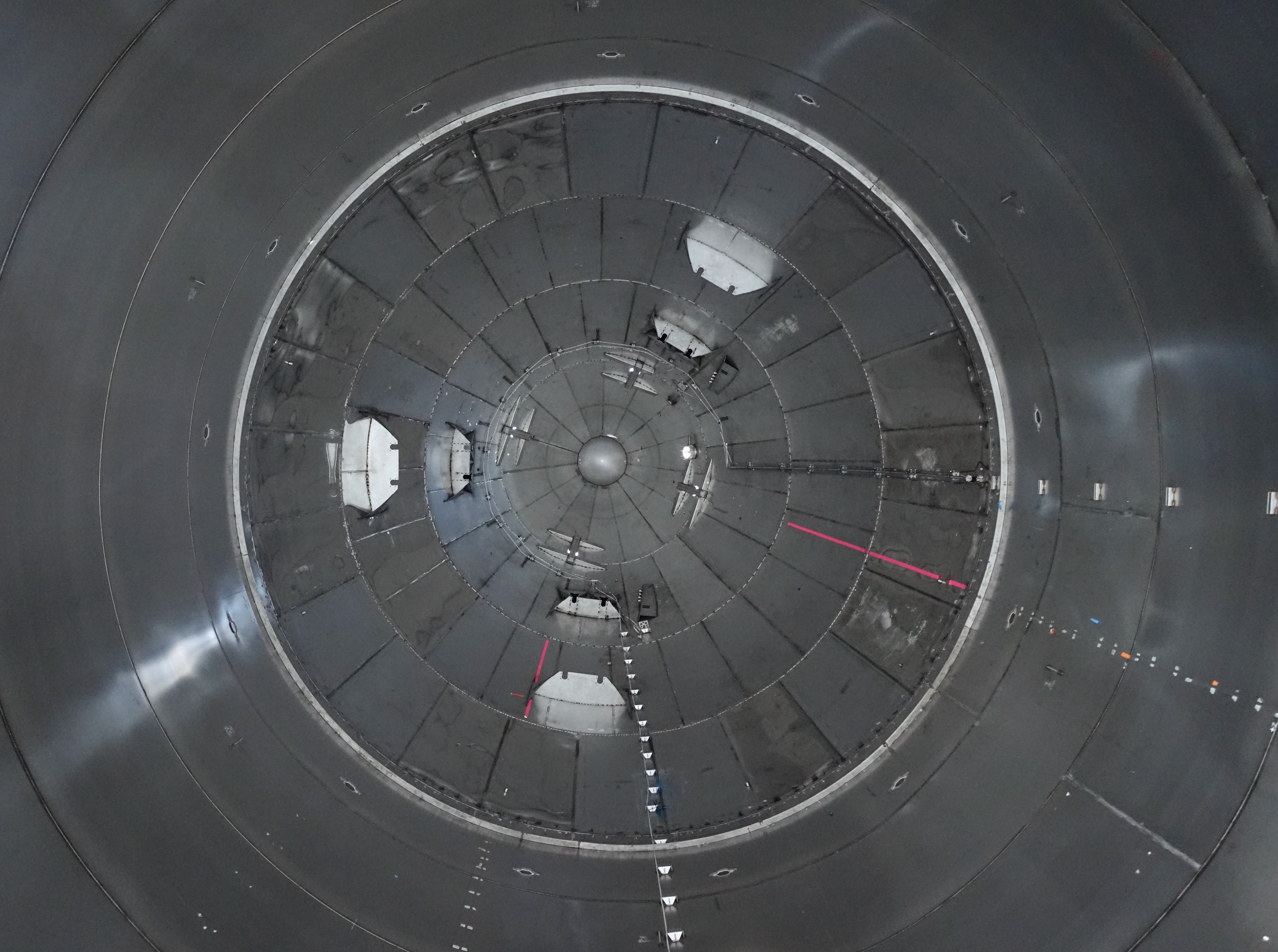
Starship nosecone interior

In October 2012, the company made the first public articulation of plans to develop a fully reusable rocket system with substantially greater capabilities than SpaceX's existing Falcon 9. Later in 2012, the company first mentioned the Mars Colonial Transporter rocket concept in public. It was to be able to carry 100 people or 100 t (220,000 lb) of cargo to Mars and would be powered by methane-fueled Raptor engines. Musk referred to this new launch vehicle under the unspecified acronym "MCT", revealed to stand for "Mars Colonial Transporter" in 2013, which would serve as part of the company's Mars system architecture. SpaceX Chief Operating Officer Gwynne Shotwell gave a potential payload range between 150 and 200 tons to low Earth orbit for the planned rocket. According to SpaceX engine development head Tom Mueller, SpaceX could use nine Raptor engines on a single MCT booster or spacecraft. The preliminary design would be at least 10 meters (33 ft) in diameter, and was expected to have up to three cores totaling at least 27 booster engines.

==== Interplanetary Transport System ====
In 2016, the name of the Mars Colonial Transporter system was changed to the Interplanetary Transport System (ITS), due to the vehicle being capable of other destinations. Additionally, Elon Musk provided more details about the space mission architecture, launch vehicle, spacecraft, and Raptor engines. The first test firing of a Raptor engine on a test stand took place in September 2016.

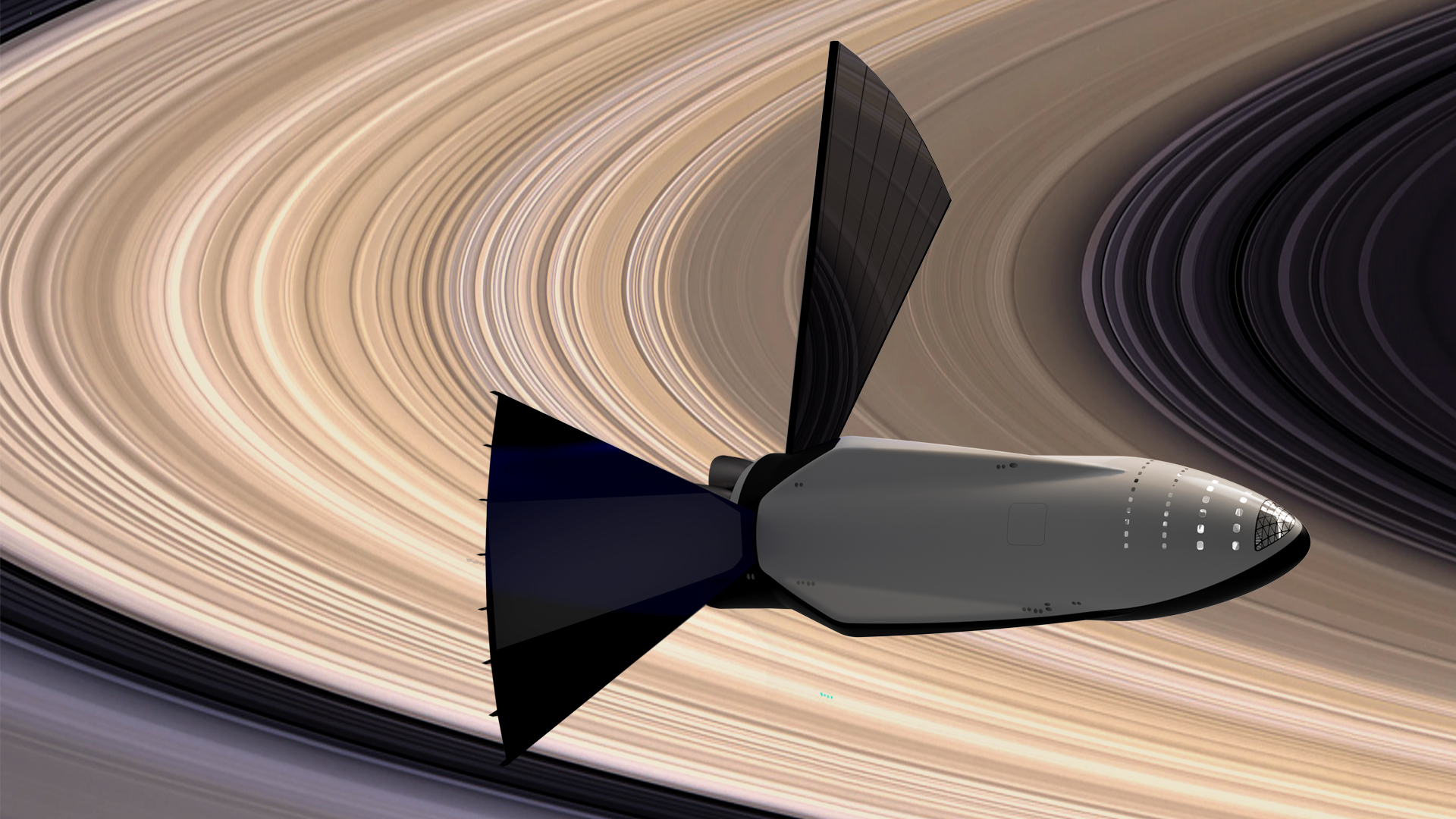
2016 artist concept of the ITS Interplanetary Spaceship, in orbit near the rings of Saturn

The ITS second stage was planned to be used for long-duration spaceflight, instead of solely being used for reaching orbit. The two proposed variants aimed to be reusable. Its maximum width would be 17 m (56 ft), with three sea level Raptor engines, and six optimized for vacuum firing. Total engine thrust in a vacuum was to be about 31 MN (7,000,000 lbf). It would have 1,950 tonnes (4,300,000 lb) of propellant, and a dry mass of 150 tonnes (330,000 lb).

==== Big Falcon Rocket ====
In September 2017, at the 68th annual meeting of the International Astronautical Congress, Musk announced a new launch vehicle calling it the BFR, again changing the name, though stating that the name was temporary. The acronym was alternatively stated as standing for Big Falcon Rocket or Big Fucking Rocket, a tongue-in-cheek reference to the BFG (Big Fucking Gun) from the Doom video game series.

The BFR was designed to be 106 meters (348 ft) tall, 9 meters (30 ft) in diameter, and made of carbon composites. The upper stage, known as Big Falcon Ship (BFS), included a small delta wing at the rear end with split flaps for pitch and roll control. The delta wing and split flaps were said to expand the flight envelope to allow the ship to land in a variety of atmospheric densities (vacuum, thin, or heavy atmosphere) with a wide range of payloads. The BFS design originally had six Raptor engines, with four vacuum and two sea-level. By late 2017, SpaceX added a third sea-level engine (totaling 7) to allow greater Earth-to-Earth payload landings and still ensure capability if one of the engines fails. (Note: "Still ensuring capability if one of the engine fails" is what the source means by "engine-out capability".)

=== Starship ===
In December 2018, the structural material was changed from carbon composites to stainless steel, marking the transition from early design concepts of the Starship. Musk cited numerous reasons for the design change; low cost and ease of manufacture, increased strength of stainless steel at cryogenic temperatures, as well as its ability to withstand high heat. The windward side would be cooled during entry by allowing fuel or water to bleed through micropores in a double-wall stainless steel skin, removing heat by evaporation. The liquid-cooled windward side was changed in 2019 to use reusable heat shield tiles similar to those of the Space Shuttle.

In 2019, SpaceX began to refer to the entire vehicle as Starship, with the second stage being called Starship and the booster Super Heavy.

==== Initial testing ====
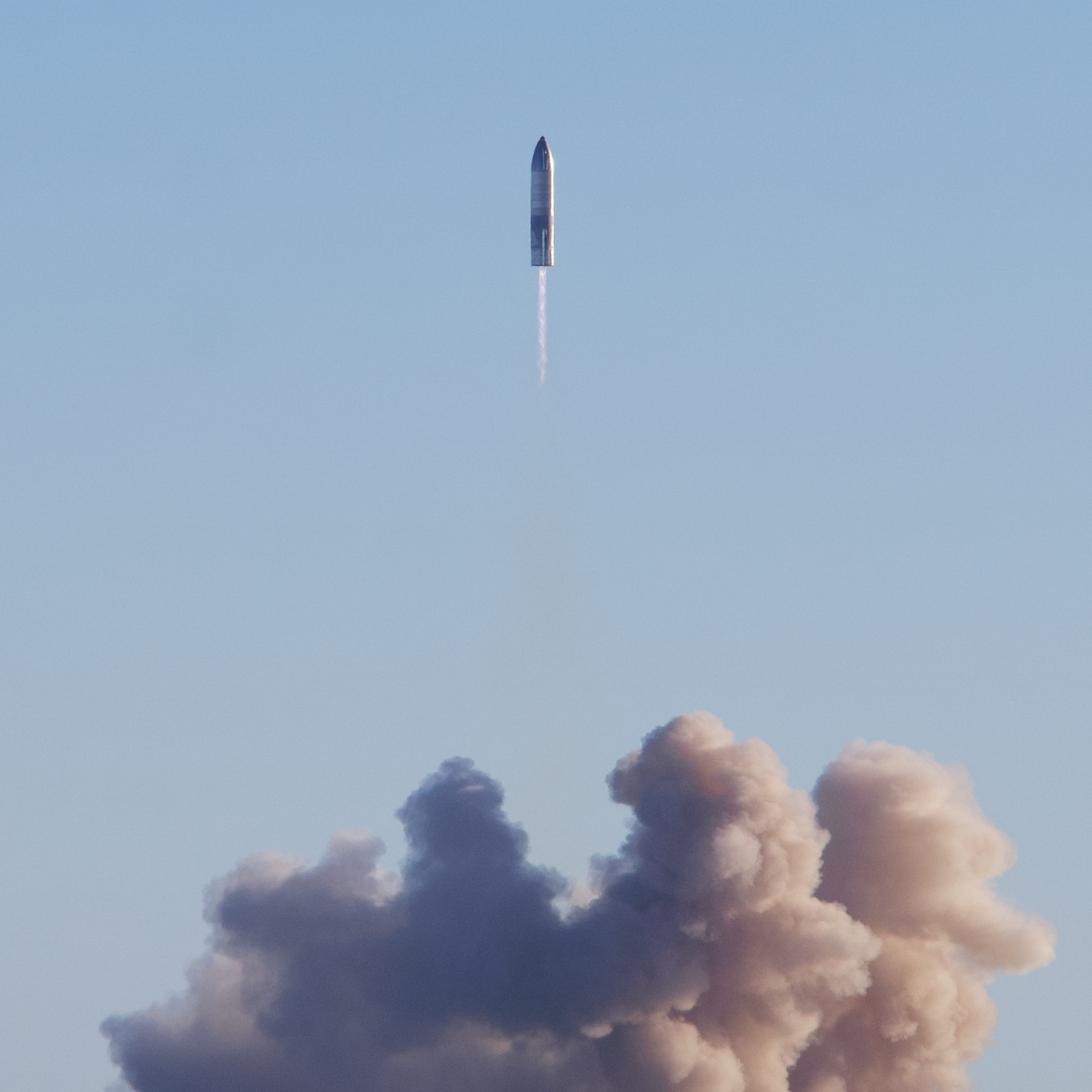
SN8 shortly after taking off, December 2020

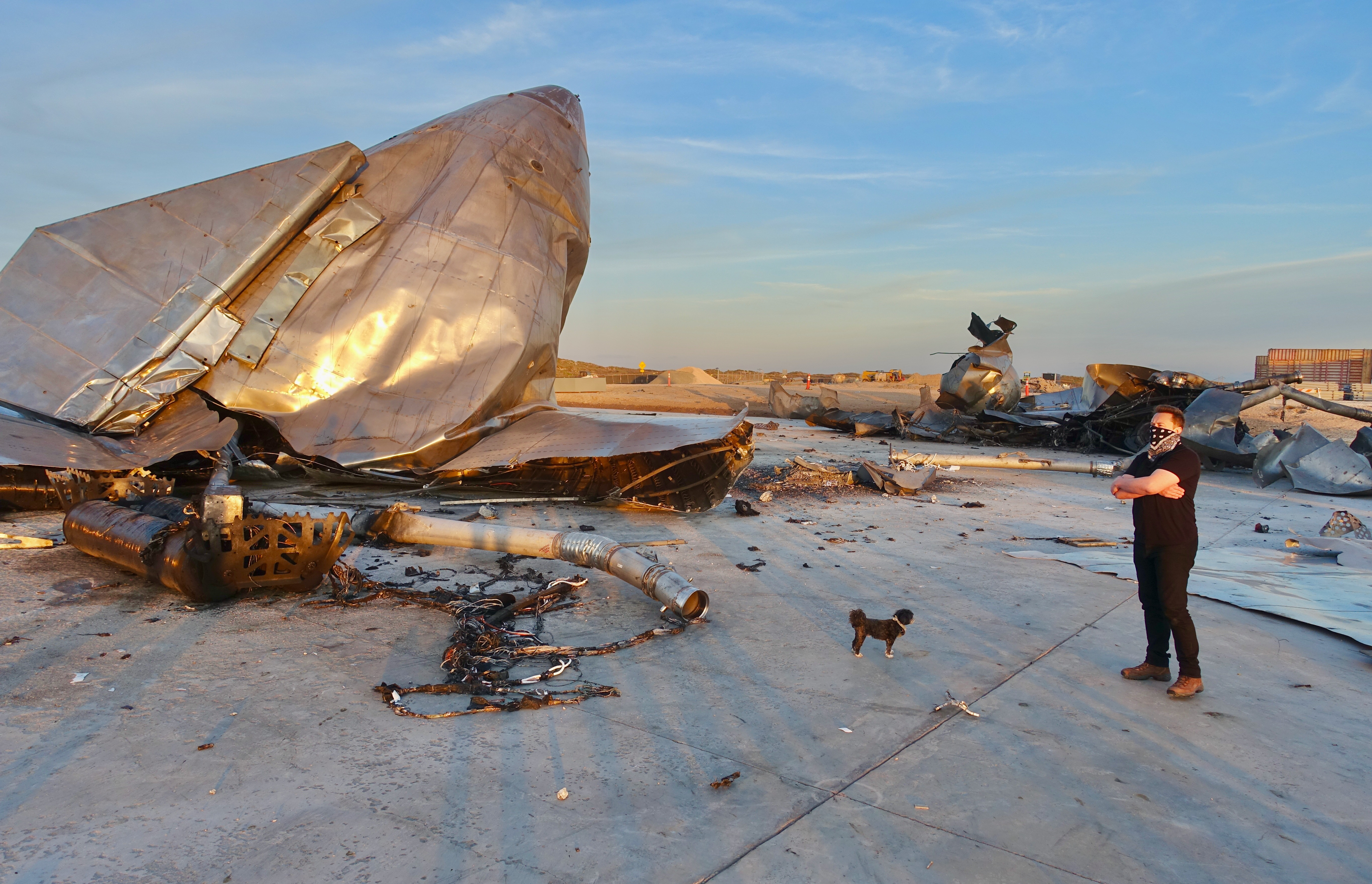
SN8 remains after hard landing and subsequent explosion

The first tests started with the construction of the first prototype in 2018, Starhopper, which performed several static fires and two successful low-altitude flights in 2019. In June 2020, SpaceX started constructing a launch pad for orbital Starship flights. In August and September 2020, SN5 and SN6 conducted a 150 m (500 ft) hop test. This was followed by a 12.5 km (7.8 mi) flight test in December 2020, using SN8. Despite a full successfully ascent burn, SN8 failed during the landing attempt, due to low methane header tank pressure.

On February 2, 2021, Starship SN9 launched to 10 km (6.2 mi) in a flight path similar to SN8. The prototype crashed upon landing because one engine did not ignite properly. A month later, on March 3, Starship SN10 launched on the same flight path as SN9. The vehicle landed hard and crushed its landing legs, and detonated ten minutes later. On March 30, Starship SN11 flew into thick fog along the same flight path. The vehicle exploded during descent, possibly due to excess propellant in a Raptor's methane turbopump. On May 5, 2021, SN15 launched, completed the same maneuvers as older prototypes, and landed safely. SN15 had a fire in the engine area after landing but it was extinguished.

==== Integrated flight tests ====
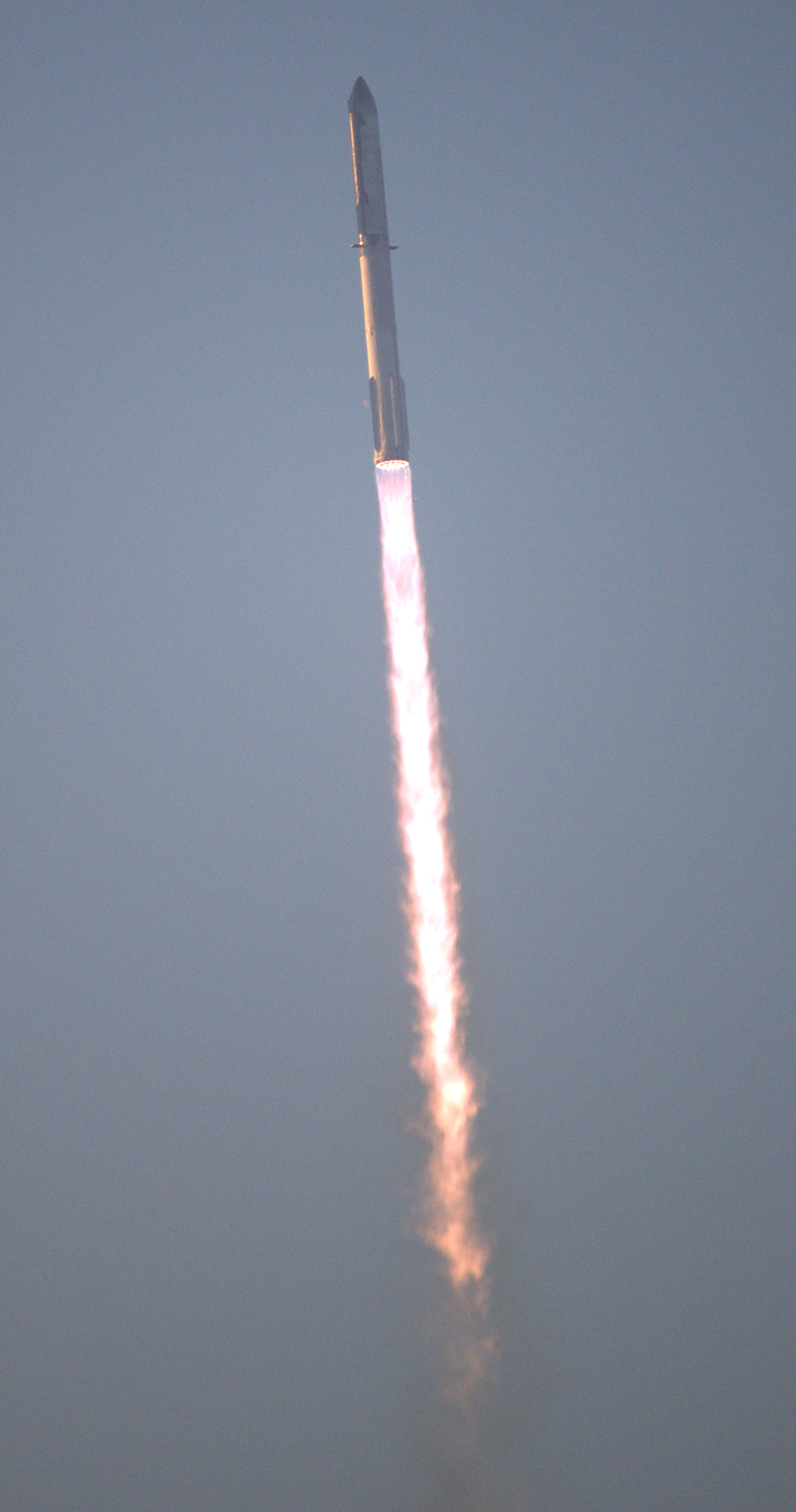
Starship during the second integrated flight attempt

Booster 7 and Ship 24 conducted several static fire and spin prime tests before launch, with the first such test doing significant damage to Booster 7 on July 11, 2022. After a launch attempt aborted on April 17, 2023, Booster 7 and Ship 24 lifted off on 20 April at 13:33 UTC in the first orbital flight test, with the vehicle being destroyed before stage separation.

On November 18, 2023, Booster 9 and Ship 25 lifted off the pad. After a successful stage separation, the second stage continued its ascent until it reached an altitude of ~149 kilometres (93 mi), before the flight termination system activated, and destroyed the vehicle. It appeared to re-enter a few hundred miles north of the Virgin Islands, according to NOAA weather radar data.

Flight 3 launched from the SpaceX Starbase facility along the South Texas coast around 8:25 CDT on March 14, 2024, coincidentally the 22nd anniversary of its founding. After stage separation, the Starship vehicle reached orbital velocity. While on an almost-orbital trajectory, the vehicle conducted several tests after engine cutoff, including initiating a propellant transfer demo and payload dispenser test. It attempted to re-enter the atmosphere, and at an altitude of around 65 km (40 mi), all telemetry from Ship 28 stopped, indicating a loss of the vehicle.

The fourth flight test of the full Starship configuration launched on June 6, 2024, at 7:50 AM CDT. The goals for the test flight were for the ship to survive peak heating during atmospheric reentry. The ship survived atmospheric reentry and successfully ignited its engines for a controlled splashdown.

Flight 6 was flown on November 19, 2024, successfully relighting a Raptor engine in the vacuum of space, paving the way for payload deployments on future flights. A stuffed toy banana served as the zero-g indicator, becoming Starship's first payload, though it remained within the vehicle for the duration of the flight. Eric Berger claimed that, due to the success of the in-space relight, Starship would likely be "cleared to travel into orbit". However, due to consecutive failures of Flight 7, Flight 8, and Flight 9 upon the introduction of Block 2, this milestone was achieved by Flight 14. Flight 15 was launched on November 13, 2026, and its upper stage was caught by the launch tower's mechanical arms on November 14, marking the first successful recovery of a Starship upper stage.

== See also ==
- List of Starship launches
- Artemis Program
- Falcon Heavy
- Private spaceflight
- Space Shuttle orbiter
