= Launch vehicle system tests =

Preparation procedures for verifying carrier rocket performance

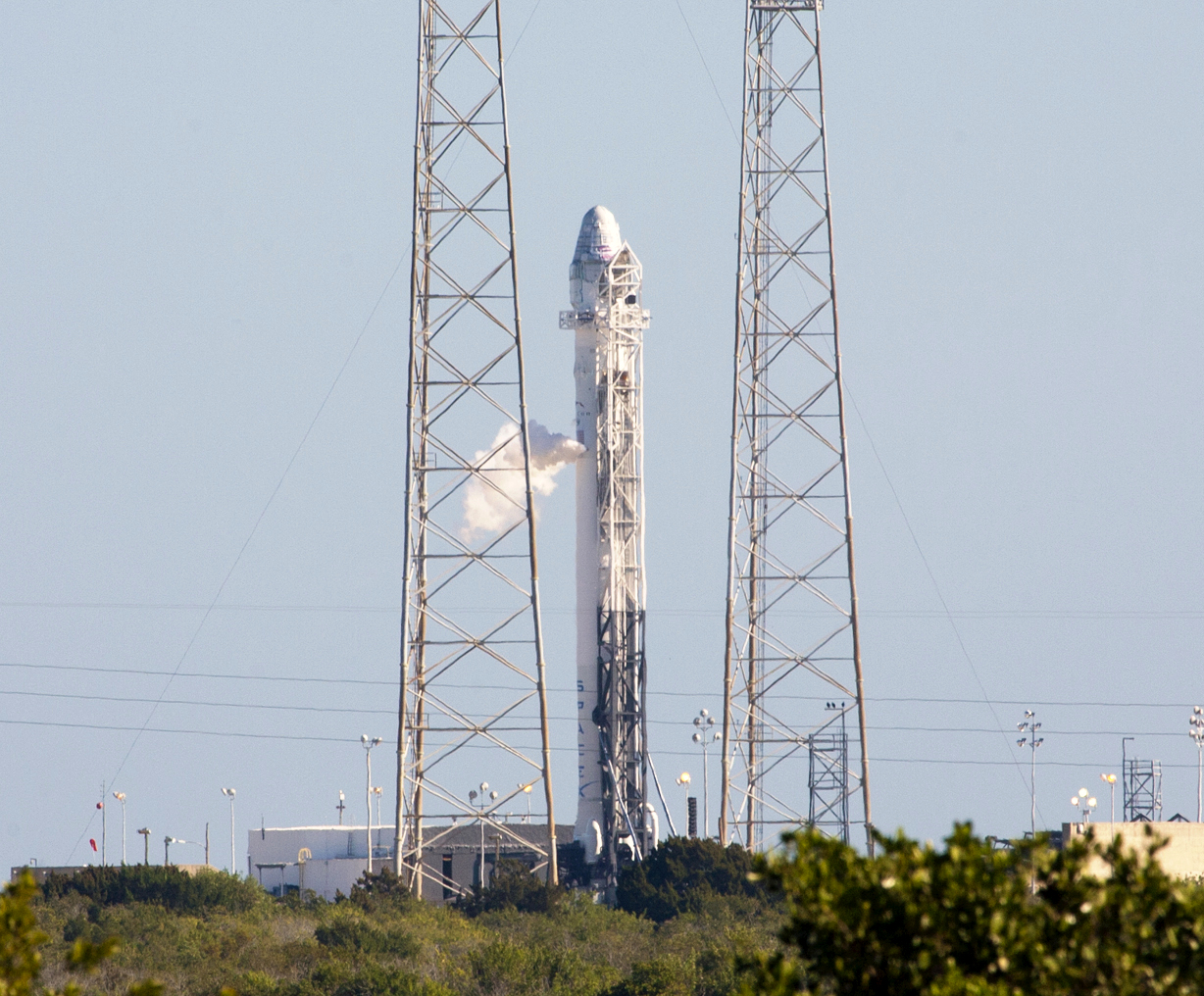
A Falcon 9 rocket during a Wet Dress Rehearsal on 1 March 2012

Launch vehicle system tests assess the readiness of a launch system to safely reach orbit. Launch vehicles undergo system tests before they launch. Wet dress rehearsals (WDR) and more extensive static fire tests prepare fully assembled launch vehicles and their associated ground support equipment (GSE) prior to launch. The spacecraft/payload may or may not be attached to the launch vehicle during the WDR or static fire, but sufficient elements of the rocket and all relevant ground support equipment are in place to help verify that the rocket is ready for flight.

Propellant load tests and static fire tests may also be done on prototype rocket stages, in which case no fully assembled launch vehicle is involved, as is the case of the SpaceX Starship stages, the booster Super Heavy and the second stage Starship.

== Wet dress rehearsal ==
A wet dress rehearsal is called "wet" because the liquid propellant components (such as liquid oxygen, liquid hydrogen, etc.) are loaded into the rocket during the test. In a pure wet dress rehearsal the rocket engines are not ignited. Wet dress rehearsals may be used on production launch vehicles before each flight or on prototypes under development.

== Static fire ==
A static fire test includes a wet dress rehearsal and adds the step of firing the engines at full thrust. The engine(s) are fired for a few seconds while the launch vehicle is held firmly attached to the launch mount. This tests engine startup while measuring pressure, temperature and propellant-flow gradients, and can be performed with or without payload. The data gathered in such tests may be used to form a unique (rocket- and engine-specific) set of criteria as part of the go/no-go decision tree in the launch software that is used on launch day. Some static fire tests have fired the engines for twelve and even twenty seconds, although shorter firings are more typical.

== Use ==
Many launch service providers do not regularly perform wet dress rehearsals on new launch vehicles; as of 2018 some regularly perform wet dress rehearsals or even full static fire tests on the launch mount. For example, SpaceX typically performs a full static fire on every new booster before its first flight. They typically do not static fire reflown boosters unless they are to be used for a crewed launch. In January 2018, SpaceX did two wet dress rehearsals on the Zuma Falcon 9 mission, and conducted multiple wet dress rehearsals on the Falcon Heavy launch vehicle which had its maiden launch on 6 February 2018. Both were explicitly booked as wet dress rehearsals, but with the option to proceed to a static fire test. The second wet dress rehearsal on 24 January 2018 led to a full 12-second static fire test of the 27 engines of the Falcon Heavy — a much longer static fire test than the typical 3–7 second duration tests SpaceX uses for the Falcon 9.

== Anomalies ==
Wet rehearsal and static fire tests can fail catastrophically, such as that which resulted in a pad explosion of a SpaceX Falcon 9 on September 1, 2016. The failure resulted from a major breach of the cryogenic helium system of the second stage during propellant-loading operations. The explosion destroyed the rocket and its payload - the AMOS-6 satellite. Furthermore, due to extensive fire, the SLC-40 launch pad was heavily damaged and had to be rebuilt. Another static fire anomaly was that of a Blue Origin New Glenn rocket on May 28, 2026, which resulted in an explosion on the pad, severely damaging Cape Canaveral Launch Complex 36.

Static fire test failures have resulted in the unintentional launch of the test vehicle. On June 6, 1952, Viking 8 broke loose of its moorings during a static fire test. After 55 seconds of flight, a command was sent to cut propulsion, and the rocket crashed 4 miles (6 km) or 5 miles (8 km) downrange. On June 30, 2024, during a static fire test of the first stage of the Space Pioneer Tianlong-3, a structural failure between the rocket and test stand resulted in an unintentional launch. The rocket landed and exploded in the nearby mountains.

== See also ==
- Battleship (rocketry)
