= Max q =

Aerodynamic phenomenon

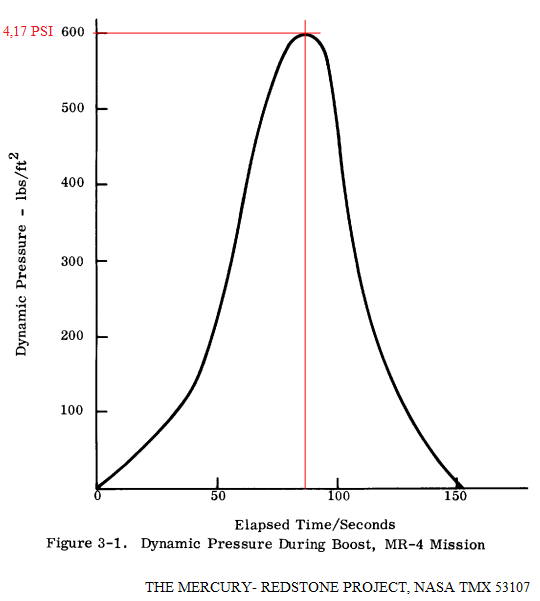
Chart of dynamic pressure during the Mercury-Redstone 4 mission. Max q occurs 90 seconds after launch, at 600 lb/ft^{2} (290 hPa).

In aerospace engineering, the max q, or maximum dynamic pressure, of an aerospace vehicle's atmospheric flight is the maximum difference between the fluid dynamics total pressure and the ambient static pressure reached by the vehicle. For an airplane, this occurs at the maximum speed at minimum altitude corner of the flight envelope. For a space vehicle launch, this occurs at the crossover point between dynamic pressure increasing with speed and static pressure decreasing with increasing altitude. This is an important design factor of aerospace vehicles, since the aerodynamic structural load on the vehicle is proportional to dynamic pressure.

== Dynamic pressure ==
Dynamic pressure q is defined in incompressible fluid dynamics as
$$q = \tfrac{1}{2} \rho v^2$$
where ρ is the local air density, and v is the vehicle's velocity. The dynamic pressure can be thought of as the kinetic energy density of the air with respect to the vehicle, and for incompressible flow equals the difference between total pressure and static pressure. This quantity appears notably in the lift and drag equations.

For a car traveling at 56 miles per hour (90 km/h) at sea level (where the air density is about 0.0765 pounds per cubic foot (1.225 kg/m^{3}),) the dynamic pressure on the front of the car is 0.0555 pounds per square inch (3.83 hPa), about 0.38% of the static pressure (14.696 pounds per square inch (1,013.3 hPa) at sea level).

For an airliner cruising at 755 feet per second (828 km/h) at an altitude of 33,000 feet (10 km) (where the air density is about 0.0258 pounds per cubic foot (0.413 kg/m^{3})), the dynamic pressure on the front of the plane is 1.586 pounds per square inch (109.4 hPa), about 41% of the static pressure (3.84 pounds per square inch (265 hPa)).

== In rocket launches ==
For a launch of a space vehicle from the ground, dynamic pressure is:

- zero at lift-off, when the air density ρ is high but the vehicle's speed v = 0;
- zero outside the atmosphere, where the speed v is high, but the air density ρ = 0;
- always non-negative, given the quantities involved.

During the launch, the vehicle speed increases but the air density decreases as the vehicle rises. Therefore, by Rolle's theorem, there is a point where the dynamic pressure is maximal.

In other words, before reaching max q, the dynamic pressure increase due to increasing velocity is greater than the dynamic pressure decrease due to decreasing air density such that the net dynamic pressure (opposing kinetic energy) acting on the craft continues to increase. After passing max q, the opposite is true. The net dynamic pressure acting against the craft decreases faster as the air density decreases with altitude than it increases from increasing velocity, ultimately reaching 0 when the air density becomes zero.

This value is significant, since it is one of the constraints that determines the structural load that the vehicle must bear. For many vehicles, if launched at full throttle, the aerodynamic forces would be higher than what they can withstand. For this reason, they are often throttled down before approaching max q and back up afterwards, so as to reduce the speed and hence the maximum dynamic pressure encountered along the flight.

=== Examples ===
During a normal Space Shuttle launch, for example, max q value of 0.32 atmospheres (4.7 pounds per square inch) occurred at an altitude of approximately 11 km (36,000 ft), about one minute after launch. The three Space Shuttle Main Engines were throttled back to about 65–72% of their rated thrust (depending on payload) as the dynamic pressure approached max q. Combined with the propellant grain design of the solid rocket boosters, which reduced the thrust at max q by one third after 50 seconds of burn, the total stresses on the vehicle were kept to a safe level.

During a typical Apollo mission, the max q (also just over 0.3 atmospheres (4.7 pounds per square inch)) occurred between 13 and 14 kilometres (43,000–46,000 ft) of altitude; approximately the same values occur for the SpaceX Falcon 9.

The point of max q is a key milestone during a space vehicle launch, as it is the point at which the airframe undergoes maximum mechanical stress.

== See also ==
- Prandtl–Glauert singularity
- Ideal gas law
- Gravity turn
- Gravity loss
- Equivalent airspeed – max q for a spacecraft corresponds to maximum equivalent airspeed for an aircraft
