= List of reentering space debris =

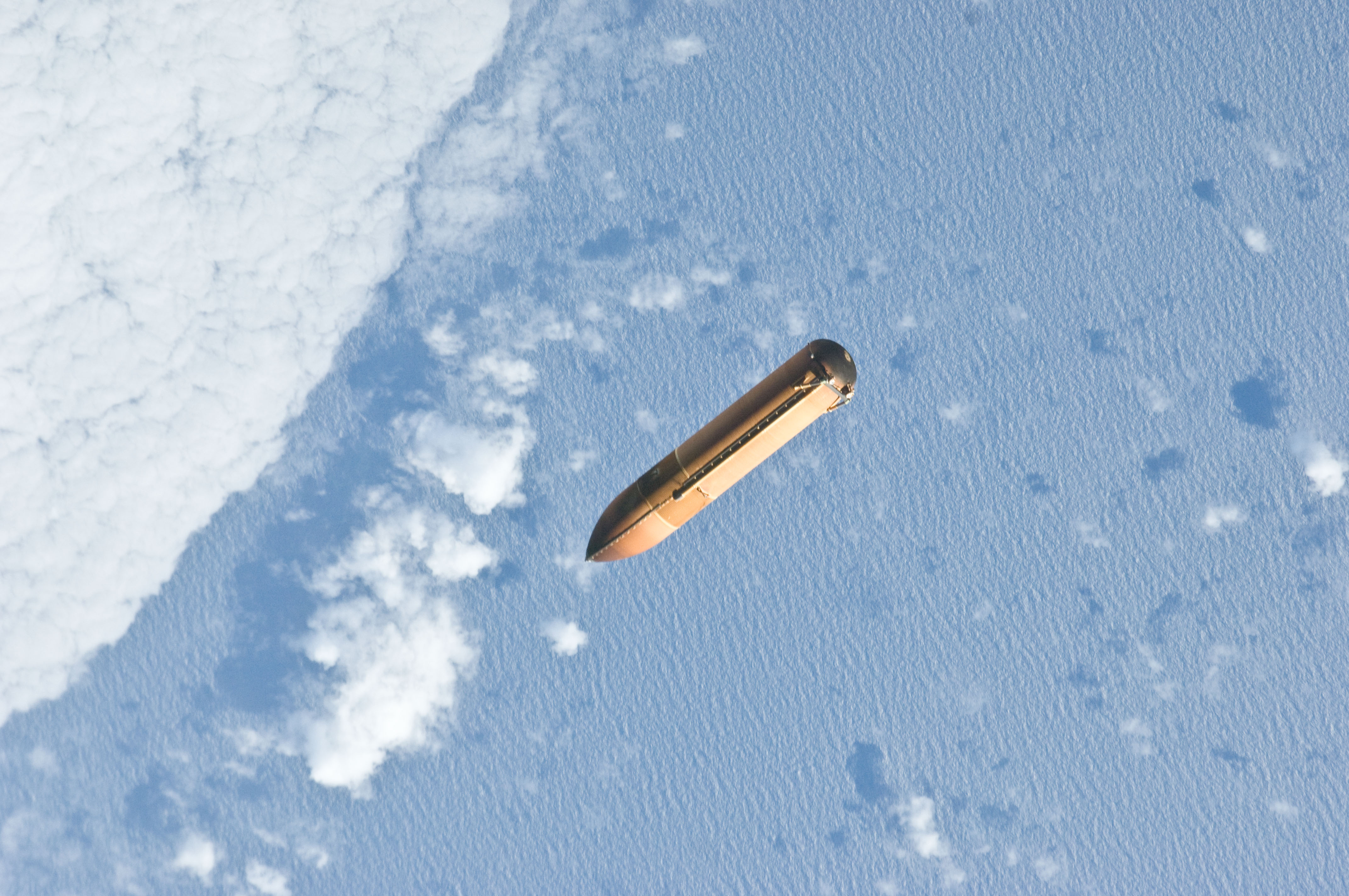
An external tank floats away from the Space Shuttle orbiter. 134 of these tanks were brought to orbital altitude and then released for re-entry (135 total orbital missions minus Challenger)

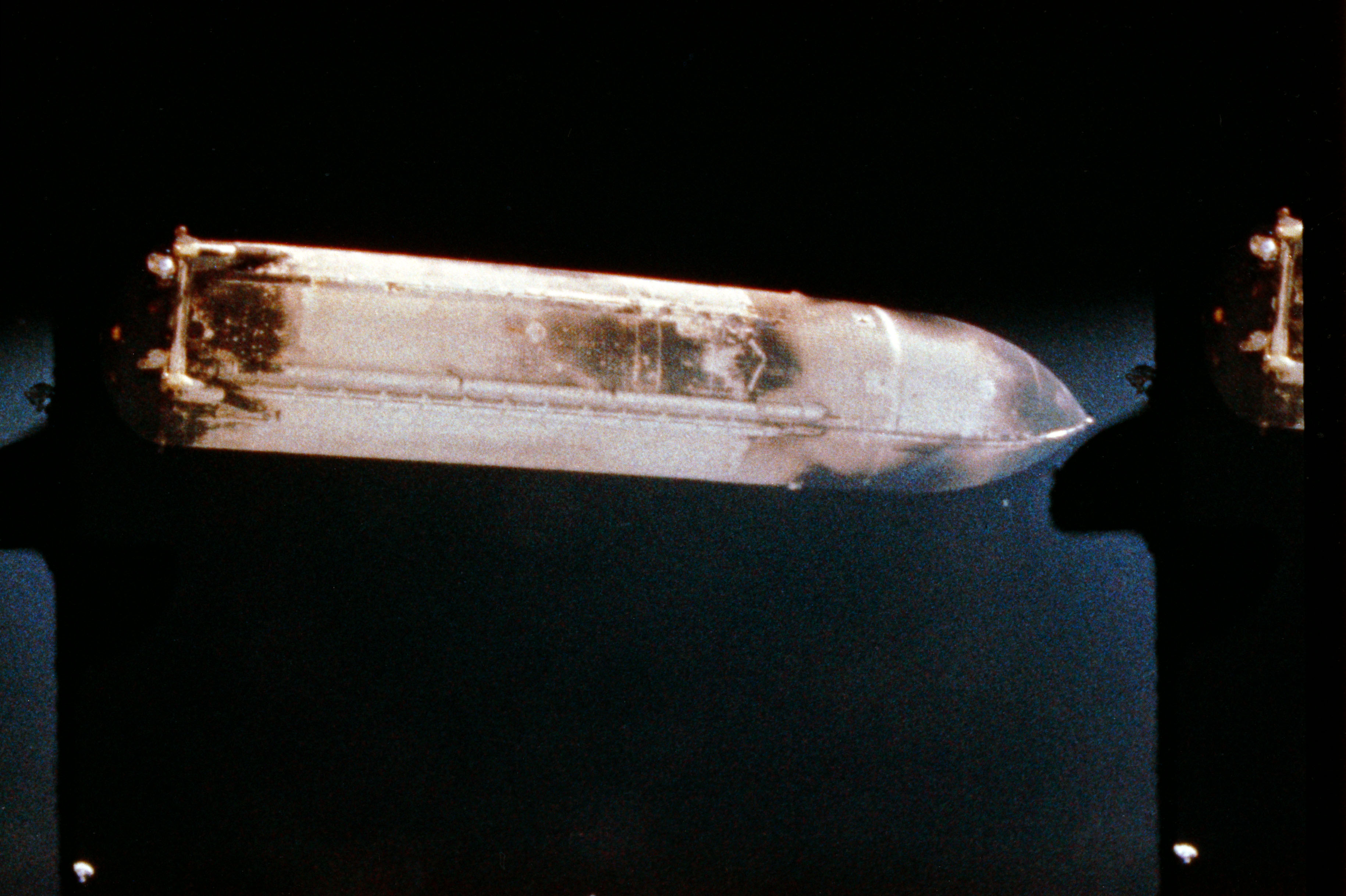
The External Tank for STS-1 is released from the Space Shuttle. This was a Standard Weight tank and was painted white

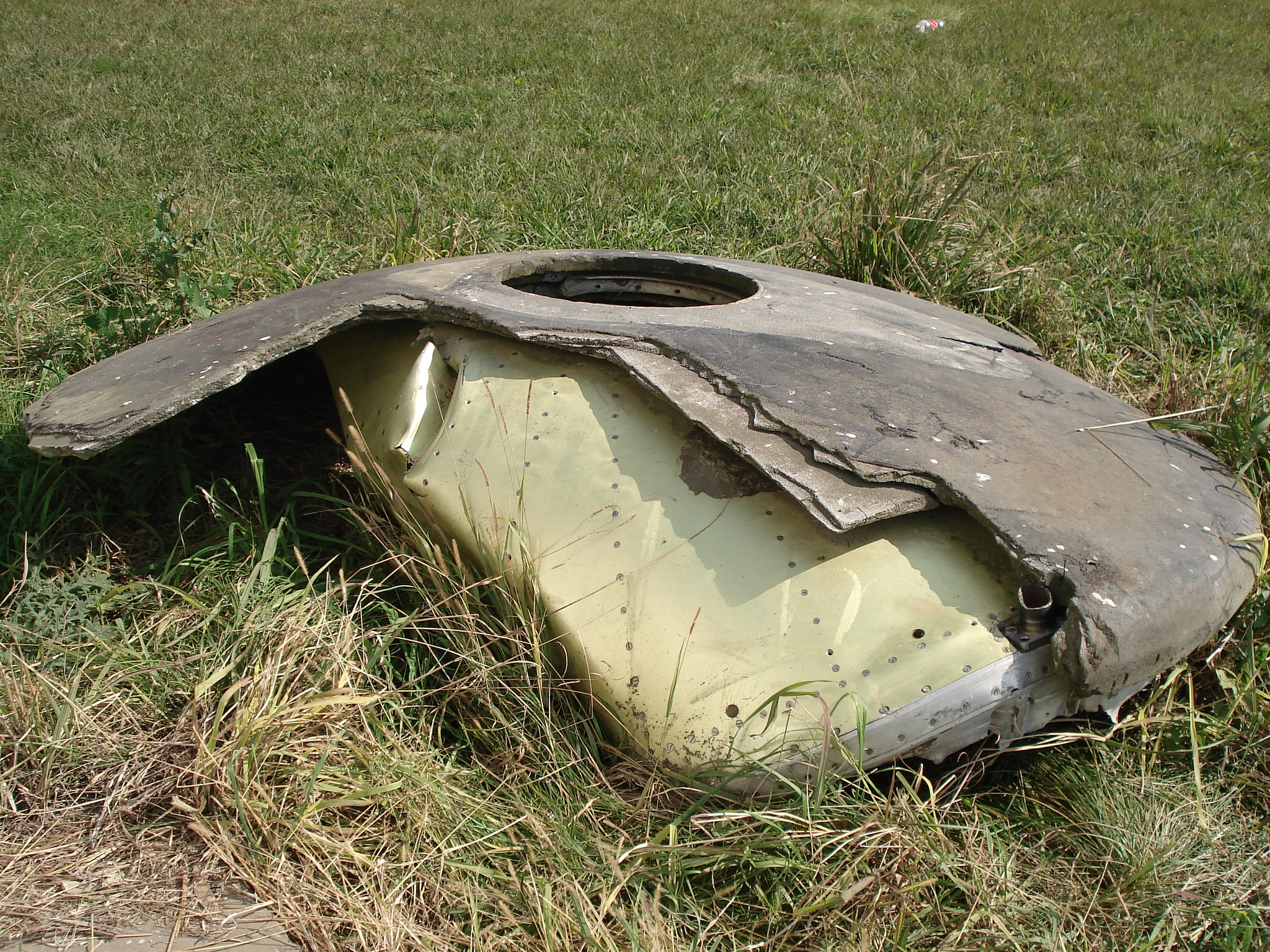
Debris from Salyut 7, which landed in Argentina in 1991

This is a list of artificial objects reentering Earth's atmosphere by mass (see space debris). Such objects are often completely destroyed by reentry heating, but large enough objects or components can survive. Most of the objects which reenter are relatively small; larger objects have survived but usually break up into smaller pieces during reentry.

The list includes group entries for the 134 Space Shuttle external tanks used between 1981 and 2011. During Space Shuttle launches, the tanks reached space without reaching orbit and re-entered the atmosphere, breaking apart before impacting the ocean. The mass of those tanks varied throughout the years, as improvements made them lighter - successive modifications reduced their empty weight from approximately 77,000 pounds (35,000 kg) to approximately 58,500 lb (26,500 kg) for the Super Lightweight Tank used after 1998. The tanks were also not necessarily completely empty when discarded.

Many other launch systems have discarded spent stages into space, but not all stages go into orbit or even reach space (by passing the Kármán line). For example, the Space Shuttle side boosters did not reach space, as the highest altitude reached during their flight was only about 220,000 feet (67 km).

== Examples of heaviest re-entering spacecraft or components ==
Object	Owner	Mass	Reentry Date	Age	Reentry type	Launch Date
Mir	Russia	120,000 kg (260,000 lb)	23 March 2001	15 years	Controlled	20 February 1986
Starship S28	USA	100,000 kg (220,000 lb)	14 March 2024		Partially Controlled	14 March 2024
Starship S29	USA	100,000 kg (220,000 lb)	6 June 2024		Controlled	6 June 2024
Starship S30	USA	100,000 kg (220,000 lb)	13 October 2024		Controlled	13 October 2024
Starship S31	USA	100,000 kg (220,000 lb)	19 November 2024		Controlled	19 November 2024
Starship S35	USA	85,000 kg (187,000 lb)	27 May 2025		Partially Controlled	27 May 2025
Skylab	USA	69,000 kg (152,000 lb)	11 July 1979	6 years	Partially Controlled	14 May 1973
Salyut 7/Cosmos 1686	USSR	40,000 kg (88,000 lb)	7 February 1991	8 years	Uncontrolled	13 May 1982
S-II Stage / Skylab	USA	36,200 kg (79,700 lb)	11 January 1975	18 Months	Uncontrolled	14 May 1973
STS external tank (Standard Tank)	USA	35,000 kg (77,000 lb) and remaining propellants	1981 (1981–83)		Partially Controlled	
Salyut 6/Cosmos 1267	USSR	35,000 kg (77,000 lb)	29 July 1982	4 years	Controlled	29 September 1977
STS external tank (Lightweight Tank)	USA	30,000 kg (66,000 lb) and remaining propellants	1983 (1983–2003)		Partially Controlled	1981-2011
STS external tank (Super Lightweight Tank)	USA	26,500 kg (58,400 lb) and remaining propellants	1998 (1998–2011)		Partially Controlled	1981-2011
Long March 5B core (5B-Y1 flight)	China	21,600 kg (47,600 lb)	11 May 2020	6 days	Uncontrolled	5 May 2020
Long March 5B core (5B-Y2 flight)	China	21,600 kg (47,600 lb)	9 May 2021	9 days	Uncontrolled	29 April 2021
Long March 5B core (5B-Y3 flight)	China	21,600 kg (47,600 lb)	30 July 2022	6 days	Uncontrolled	24 July 2022
Long March 5B core (5B-Y4 flight)	China	21,600 kg (47,600 lb)	4 November 2022	4 days	Uncontrolled	31 October 2022
Cosmos 557	USSR	19,400 kg (42,800 lb)	22 May 1973	11 days	Uncontrolled	11 May 1973
Salyut 5	USSR	19,000 kg (42,000 lb)	8 August 1977	1 year 2 months	Controlled	2 June 1976
Salyut 1	USSR	18,900 kg (41,700 lb)	11 October 1971	5 months 22 days	Controlled	19 April 1971
Salyut 3	USSR	18,900 kg (41,700 lb)	24 January 1975	6 months 30 days	Controlled	25 June 1974
Salyut 4	USSR	18,900 kg (41,700 lb)	2 February 1977	2 years 1 month	Controlled	26 December 1974
Apollo SA-5 Nose Cone	USA	17,100 kg (37,700 lb)	30 April 1966	2 years 3 months	Uncontrolled	29 January 1964
Apollo SA-6 CSM BP-13	USA	16,900 kg (37,300 lb)	1 June 1964	4 days	Uncontrolled	28 May 1964
Apollo SA-7 CSM BP-15	USA	16,650 kg (36,710 lb)	22 September 1964	4 days	Uncontrolled	18 September 1964
Cosmos 929	USSR	15,000 kg (33,000 lb)	2 February 1978	6 months 16 days	Controlled	17 July 1977
Cosmos 1443	USSR	15,000 kg (33,000 lb)	19 September 1983	6 months 17 days	Controlled	2 March 1983
CGRO	USA	14,910 kg (32,870 lb)	4 June 2000	9 years	Controlled	5 April 1991
Phobos-Grunt	Russia	13,500 kg (29,800 lb)	15 January 2012	2 months 6 days	Uncontrolled	9 November 2011
Pegasus 1	USA	10,297 kg (22,701 lb)	17 September 1978	13 years	Uncontrolled	16 February 1965
Pegasus 2	USA	9,058 kg (19,969 lb)	3 November 1979	14 years	Uncontrolled	25 May 1965
Tiangong-1	China	8,506 kg (18,753 lb)	2 April 2018	6 years	Uncontrolled	29 Sep 2011
UARS	NASA	5,900 kg (13,000 lb)	24 September 2011	20 years	Uncontrolled	12 September 1991
ROSAT	DLR	2,400 kg (5,300 lb)	23 October 2011	21 years	Uncontrolled	1 June 1990

== See also ==
- Center for Orbital and Reentry Debris Studies
- Space Shuttle external tank
- List of heaviest spacecraft
- List of space debris producing events
- List of space debris fall incidents
