= List of heaviest spacecraft =

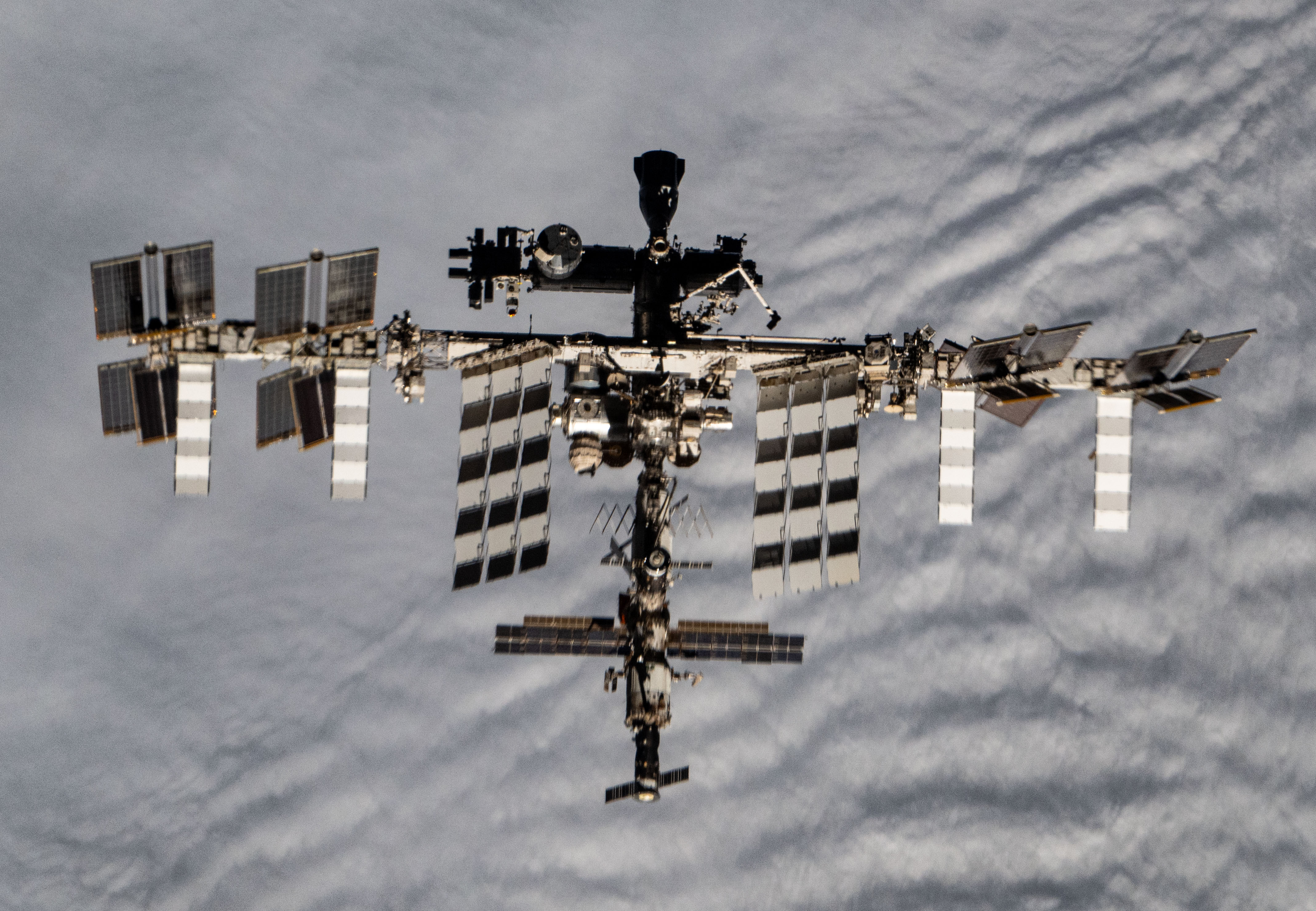

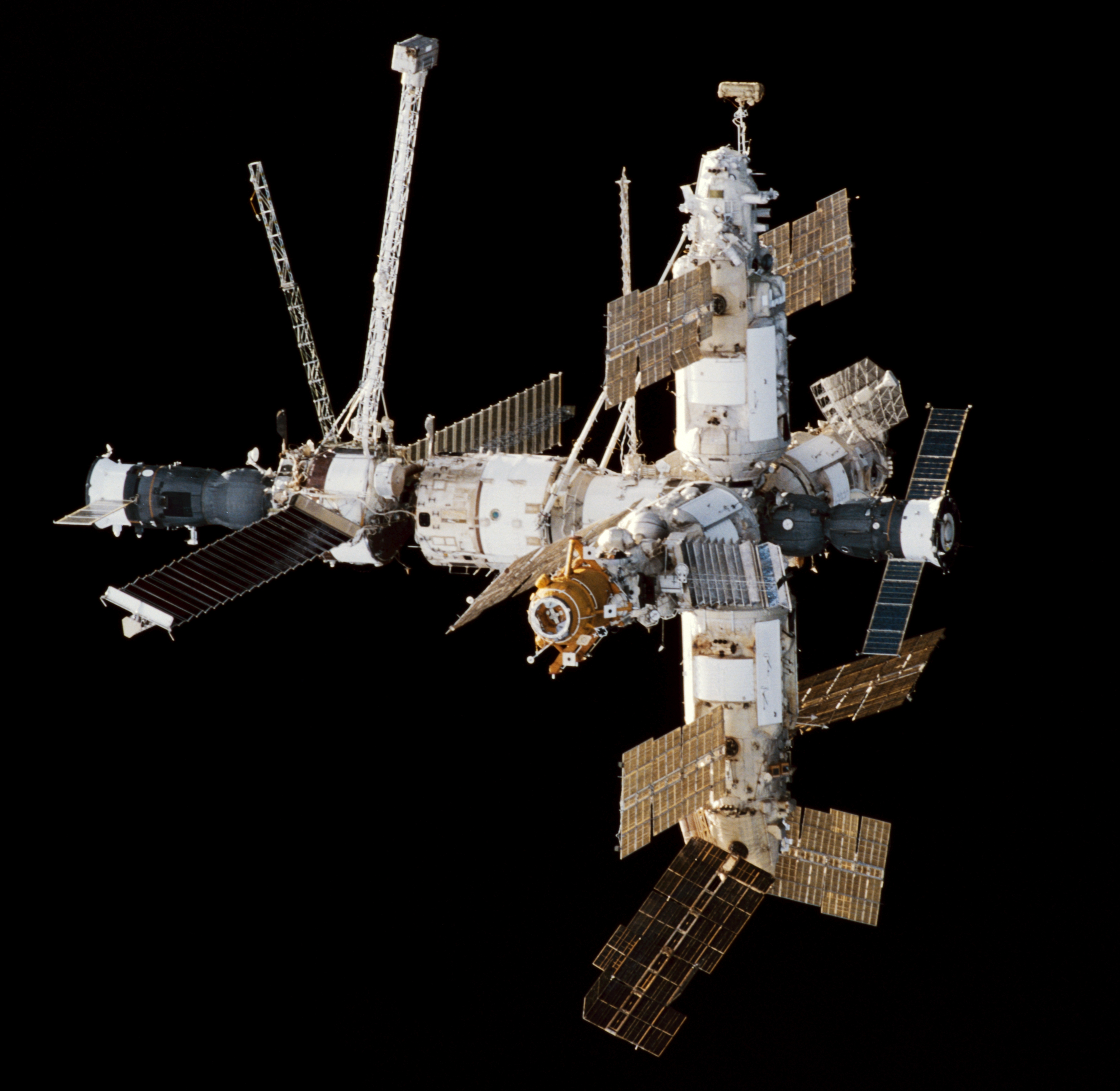

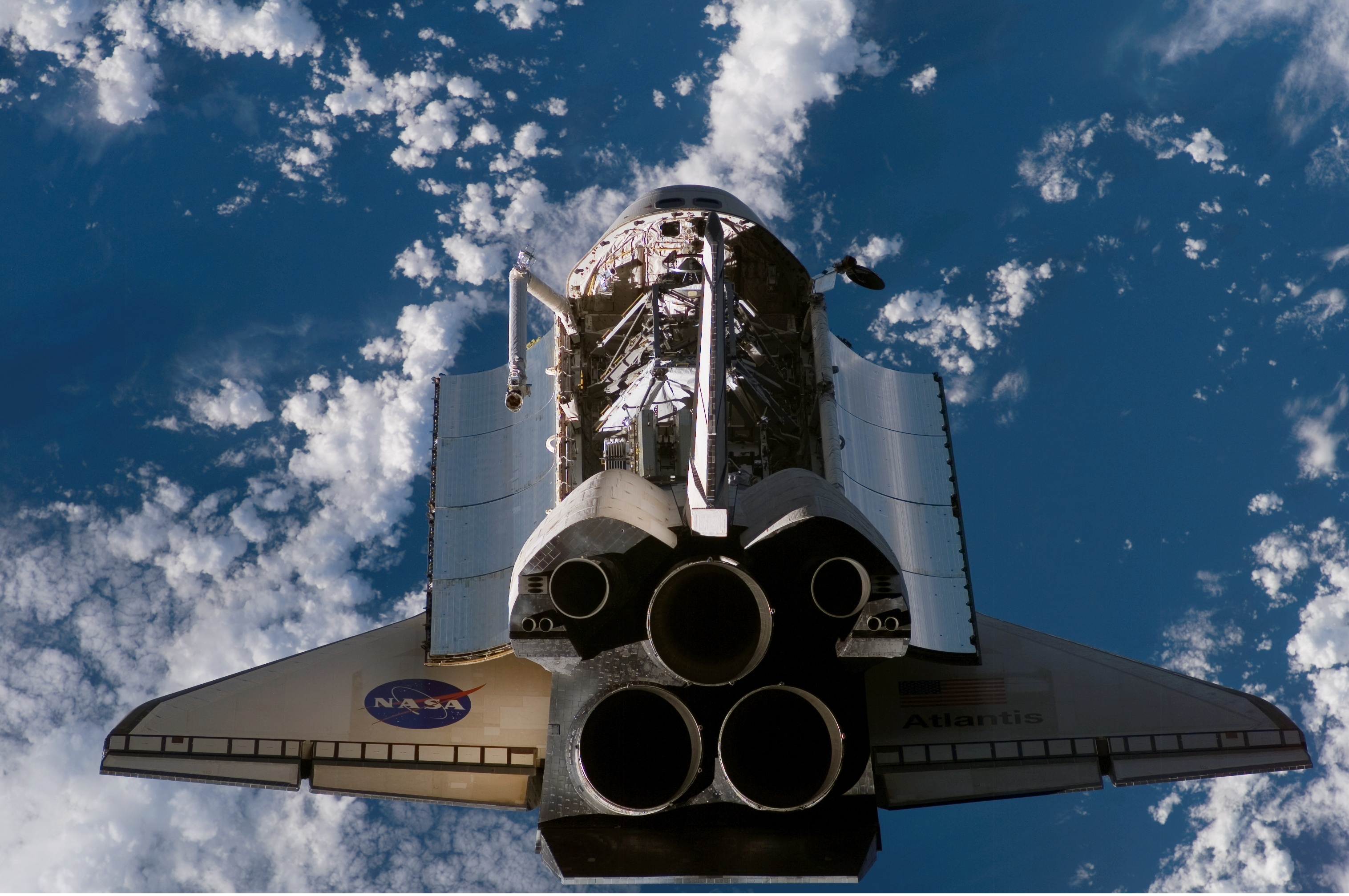

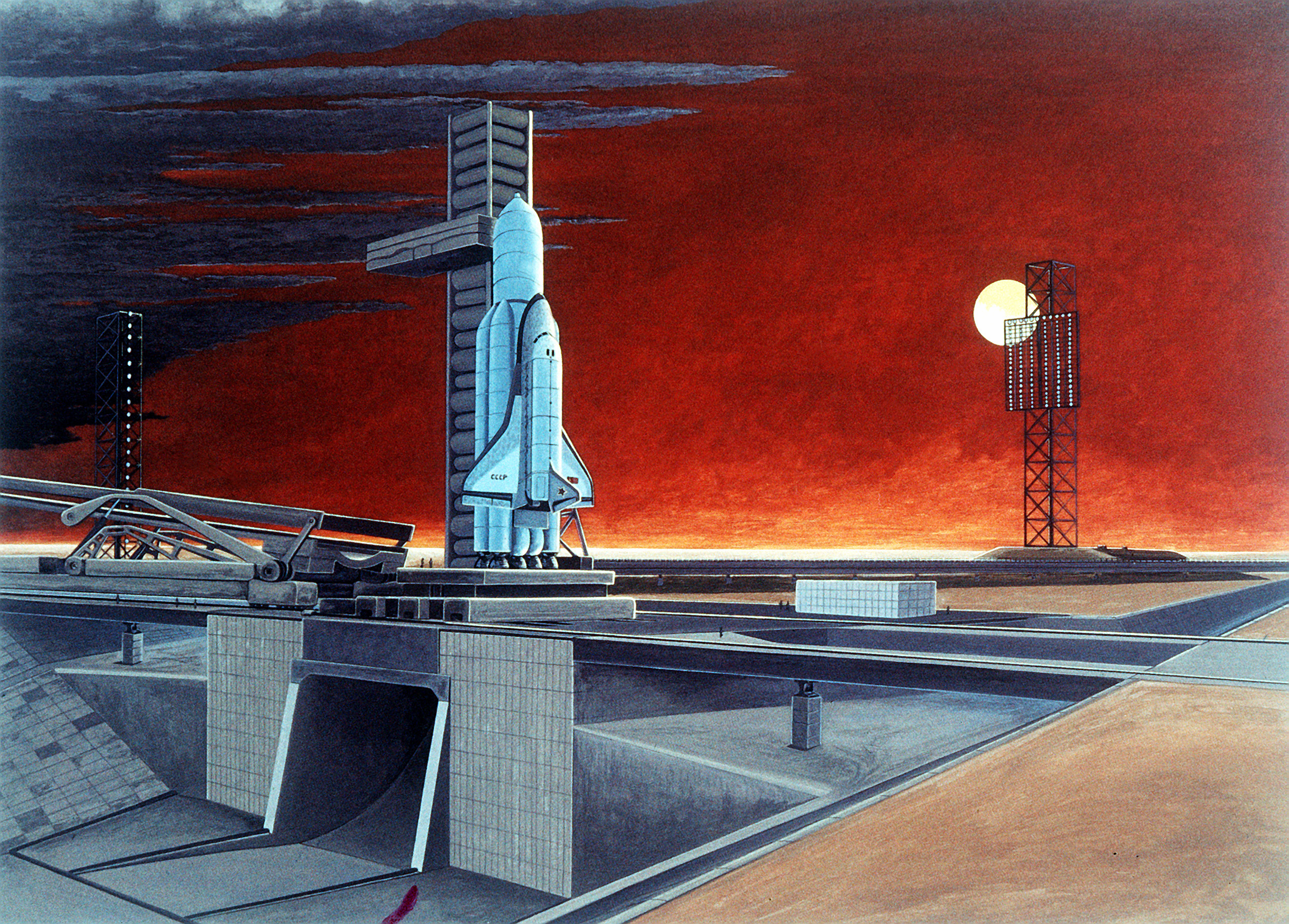

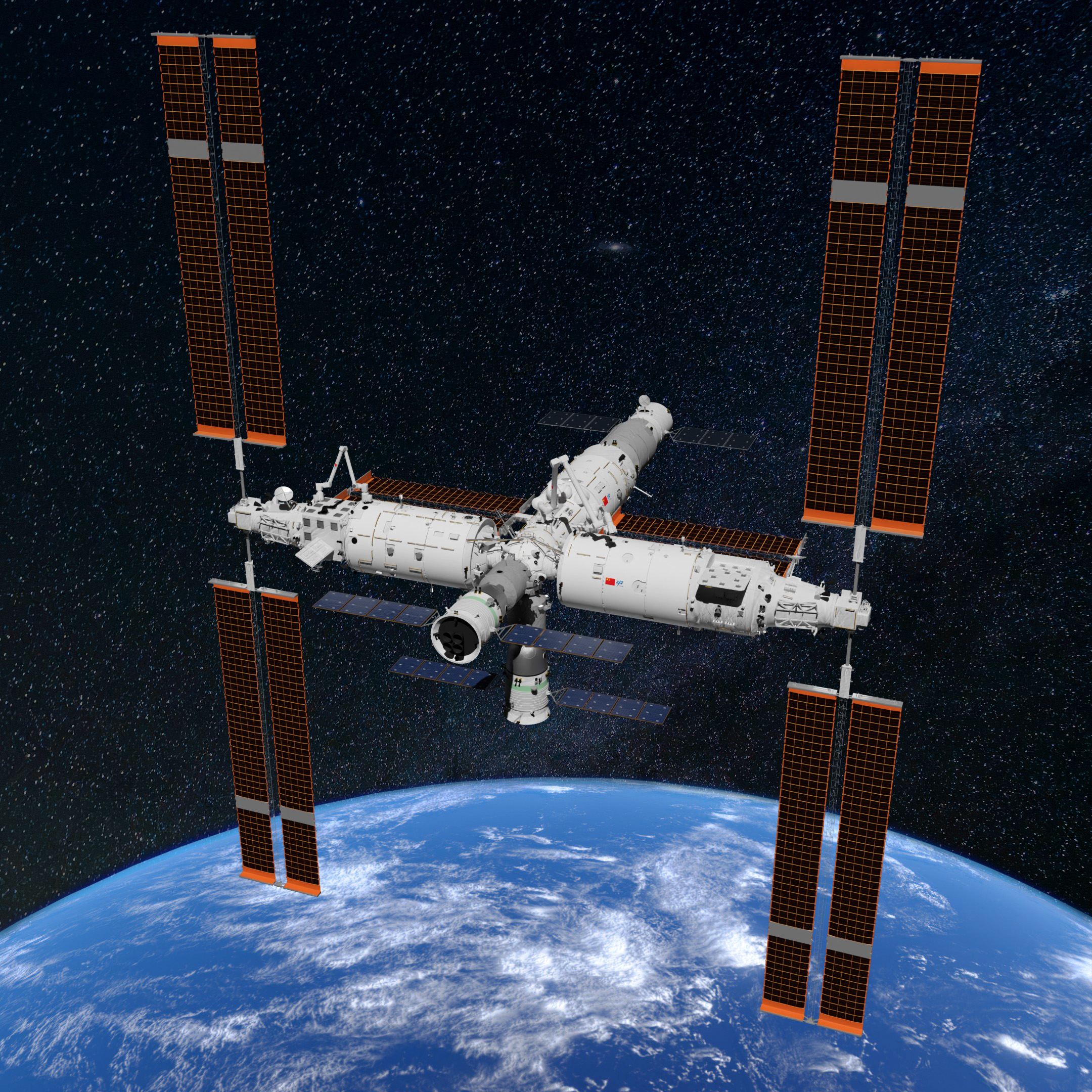

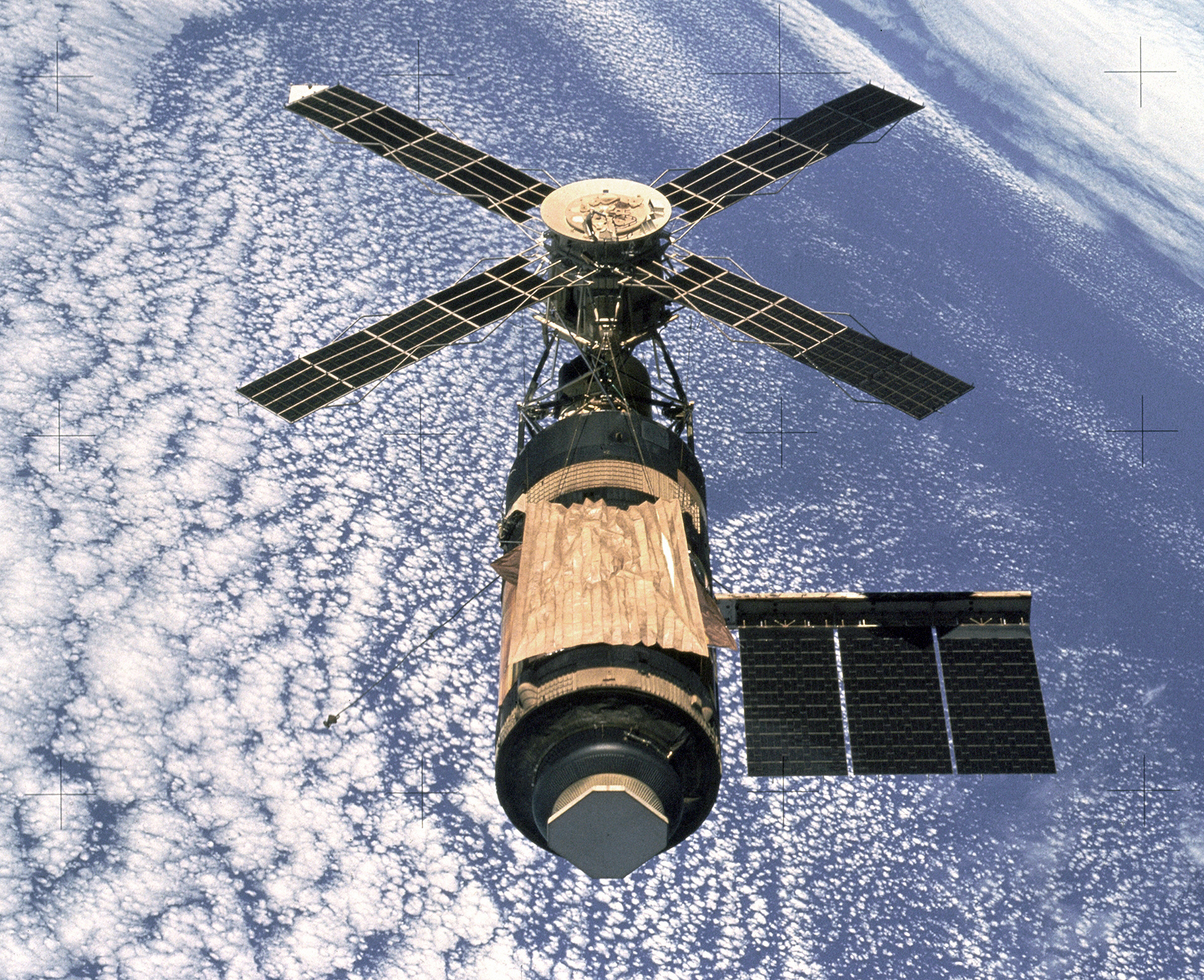

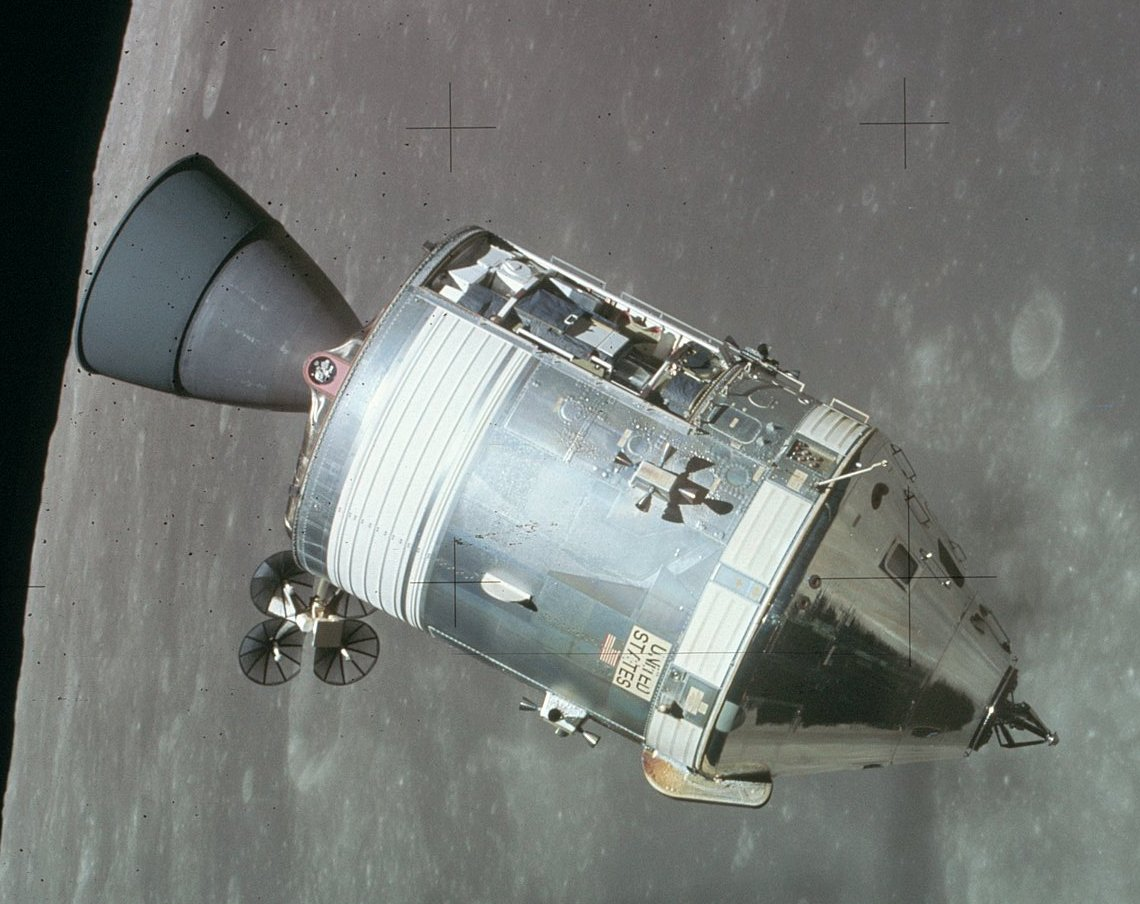

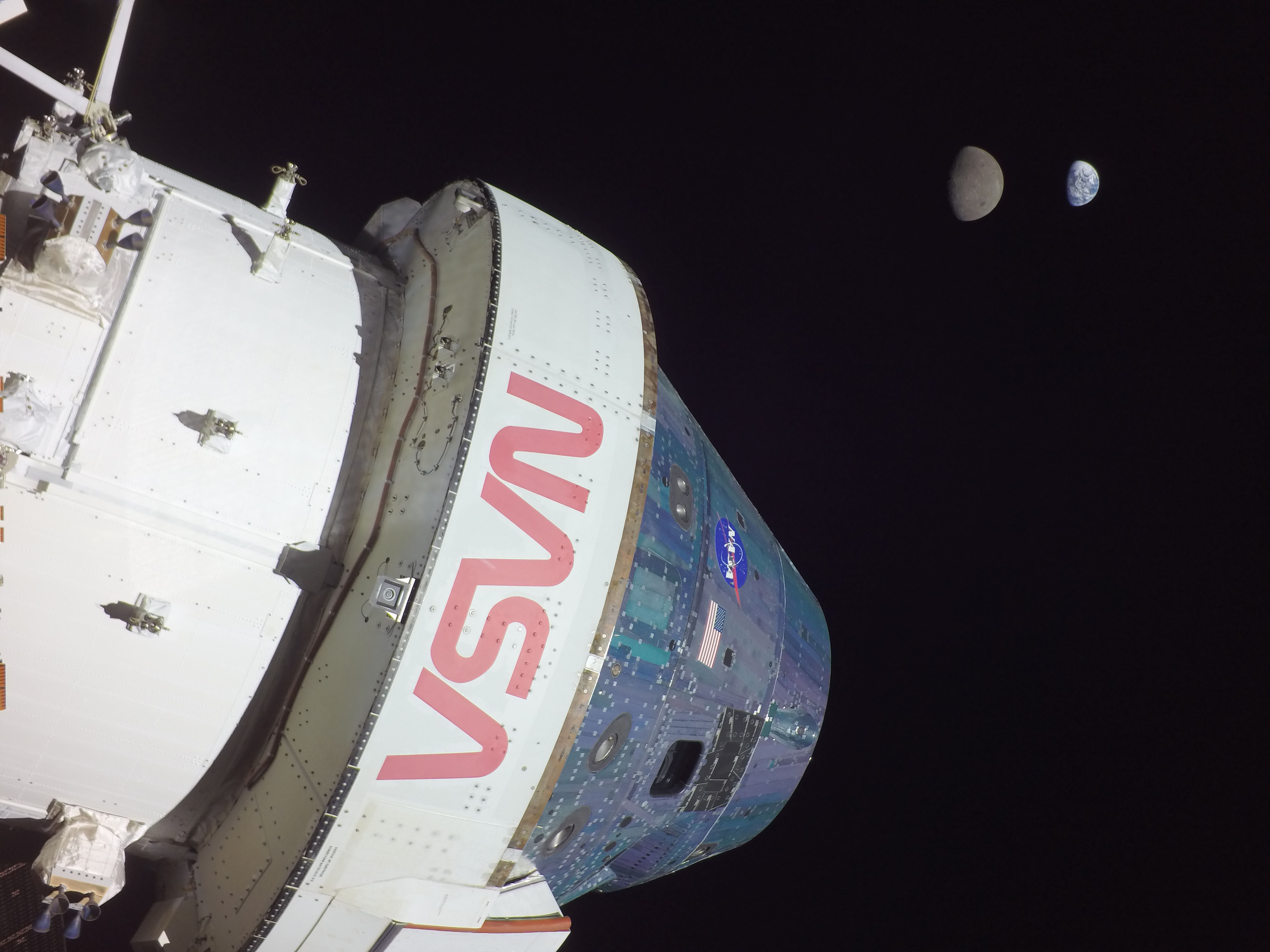

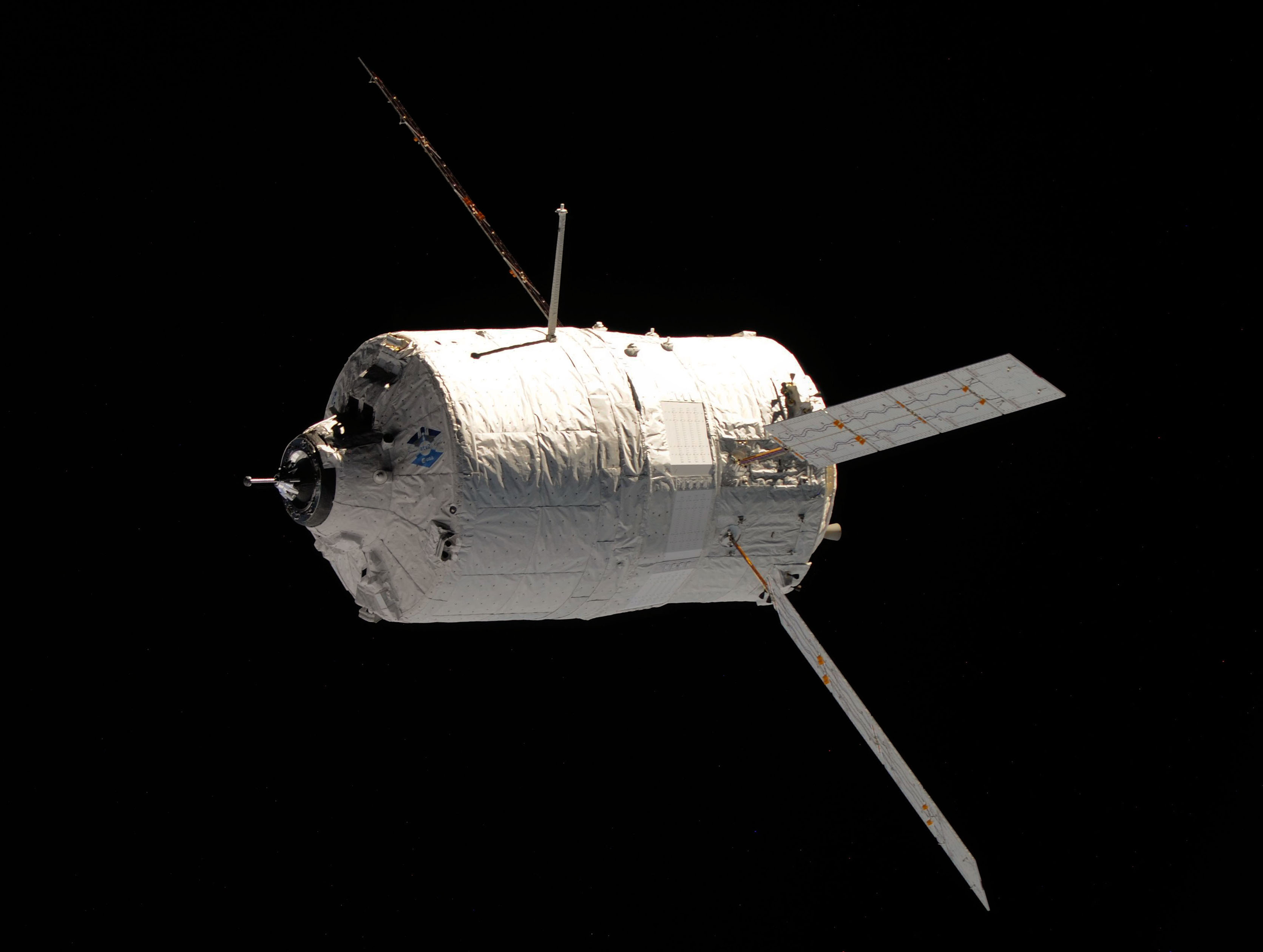

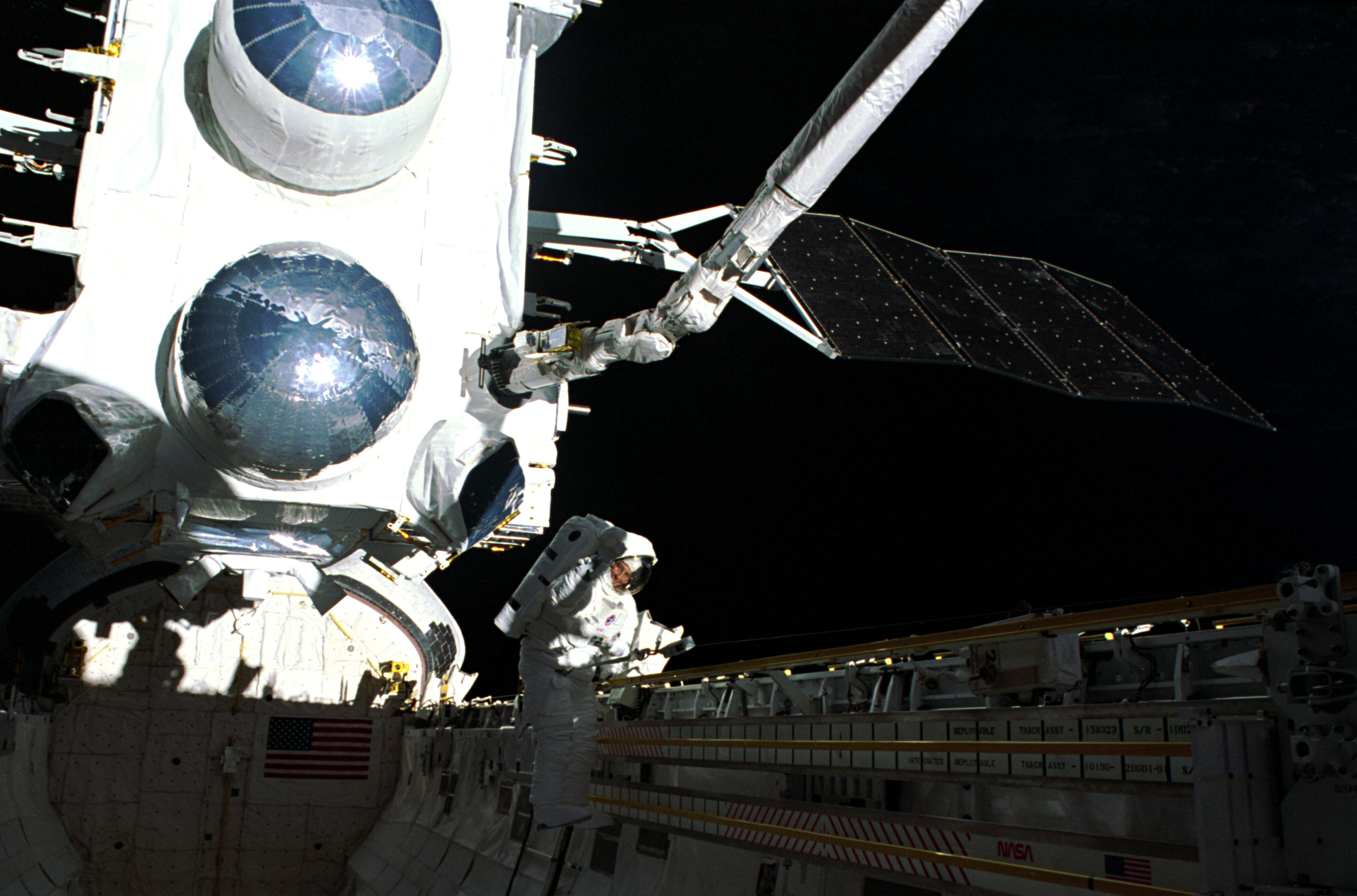

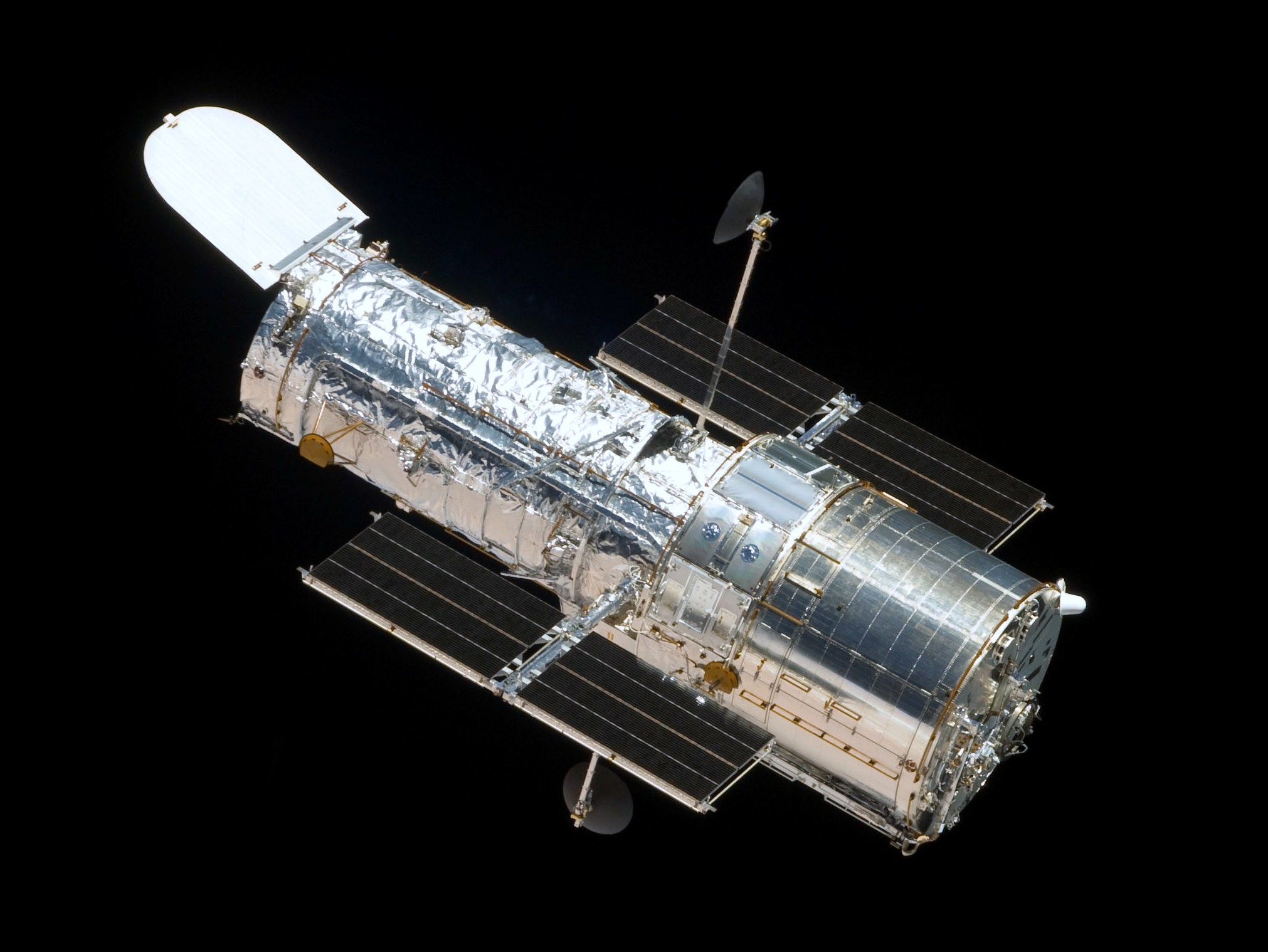

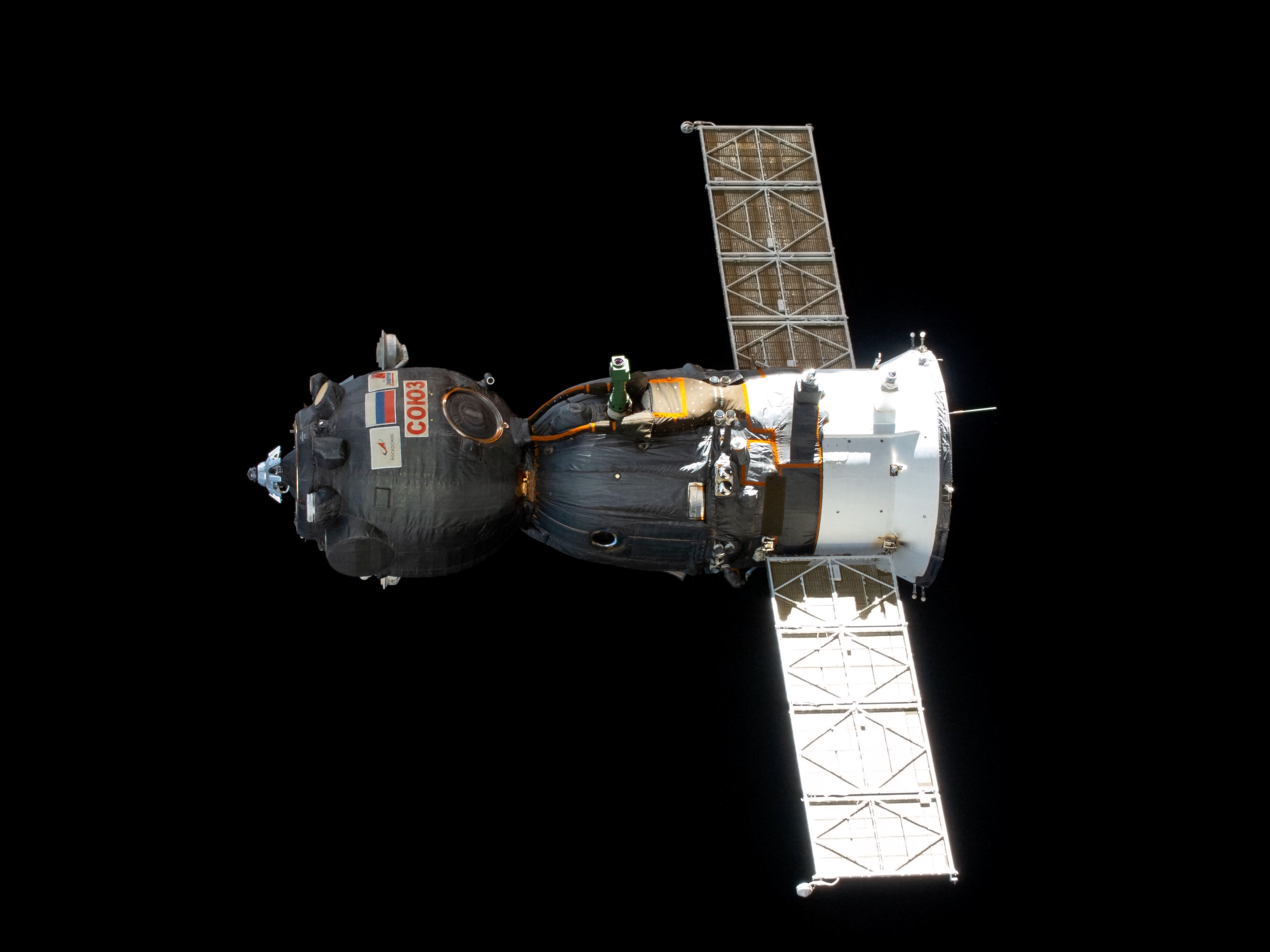

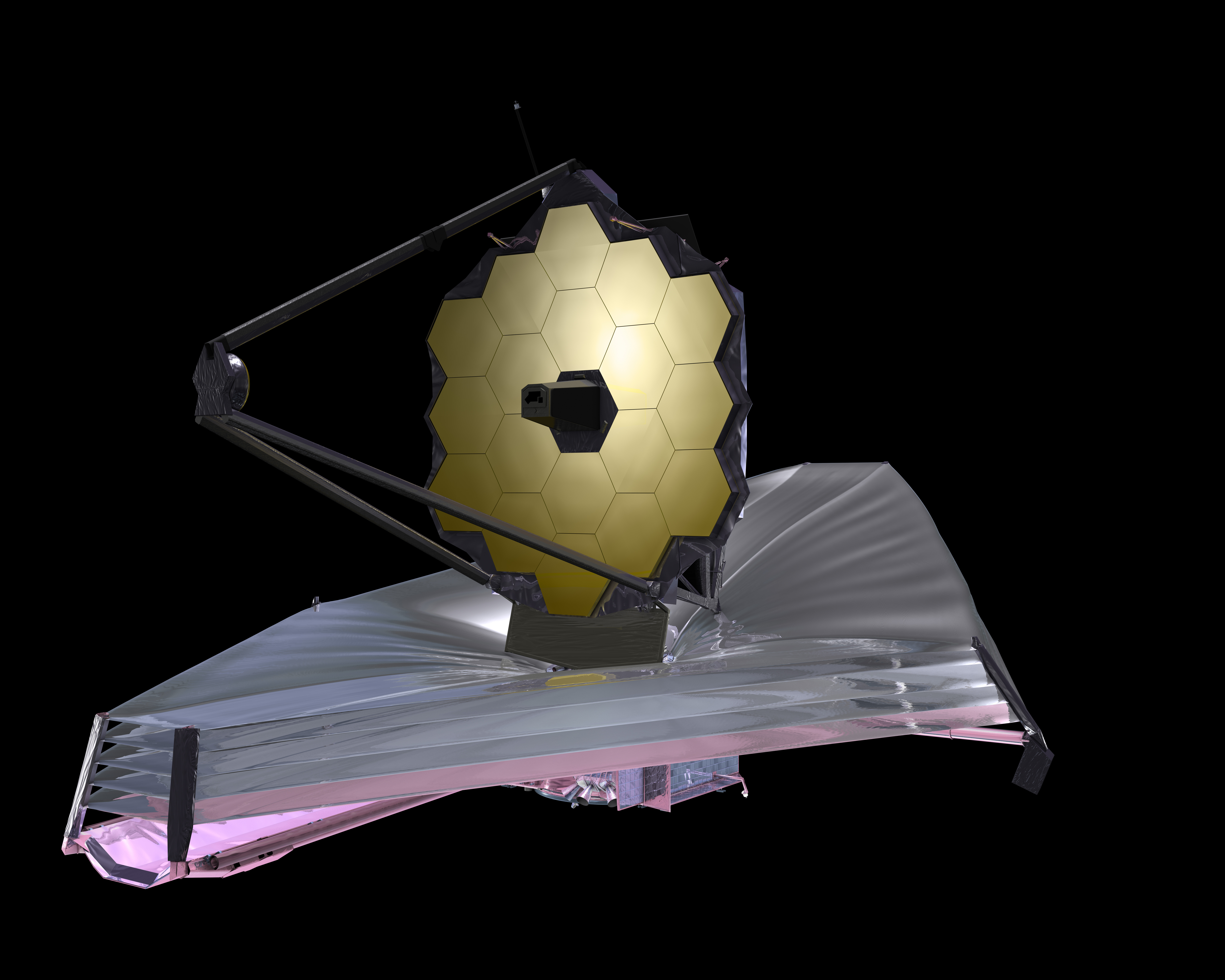

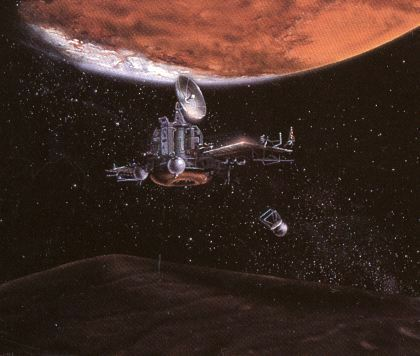

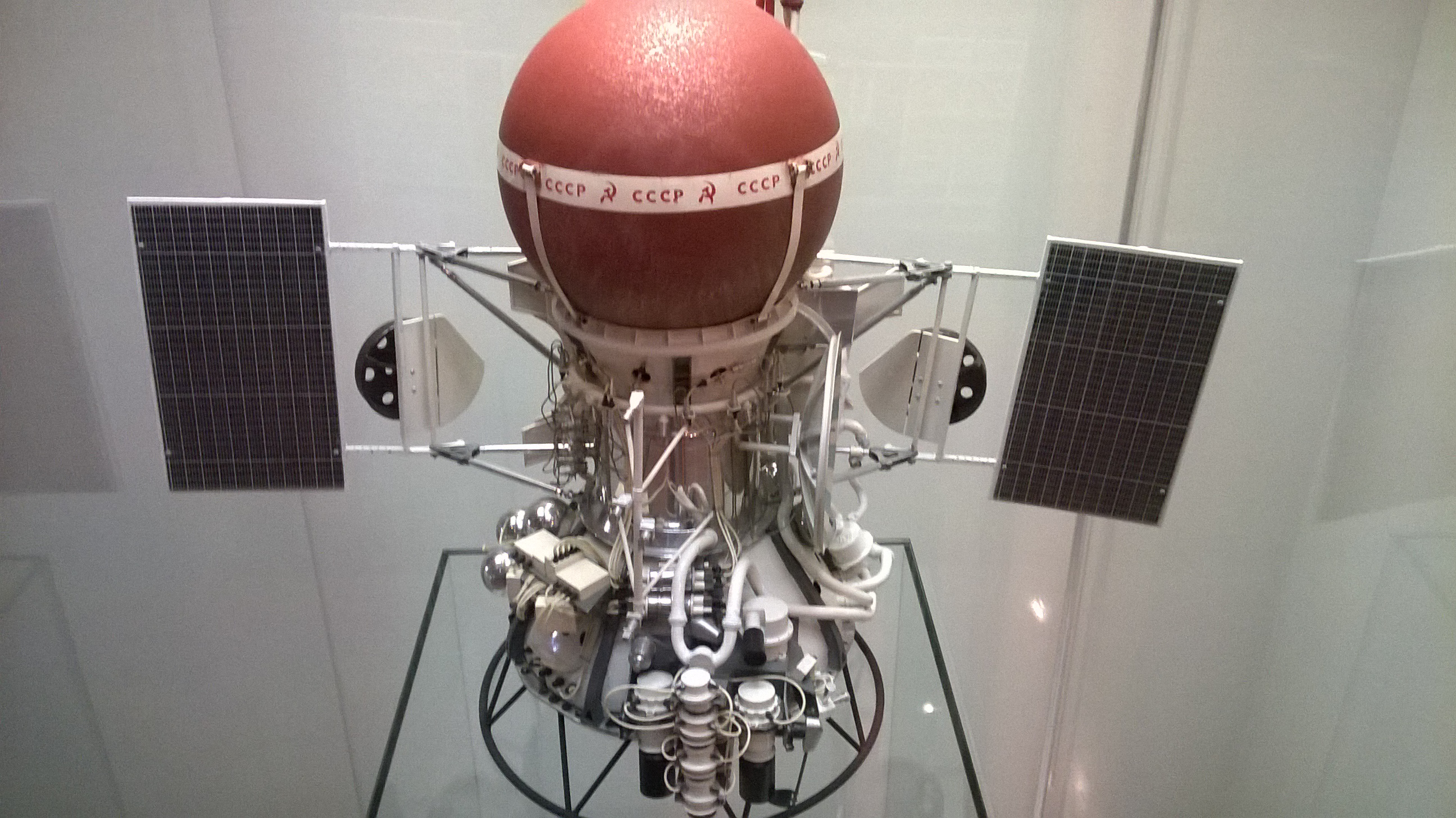

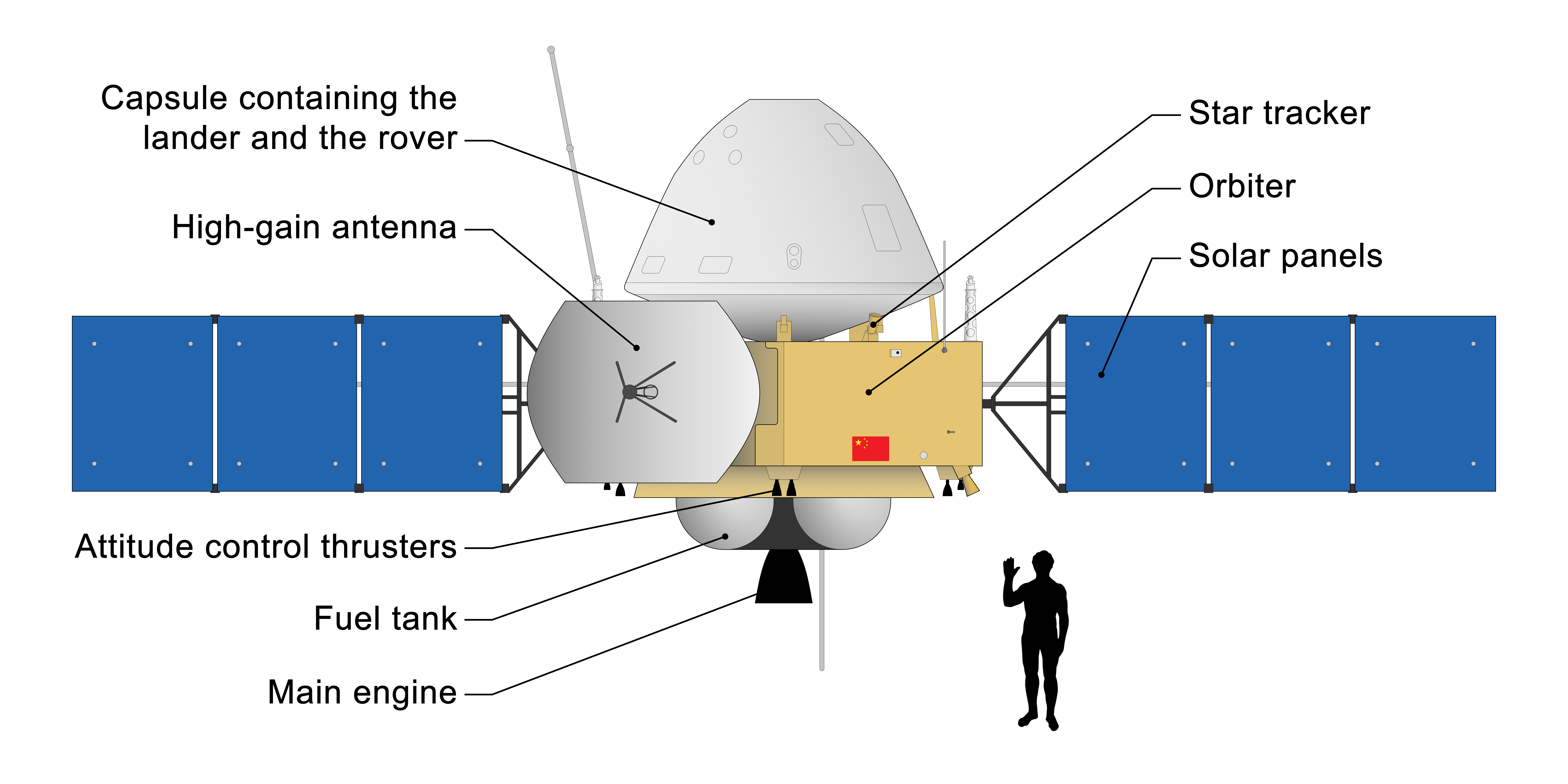

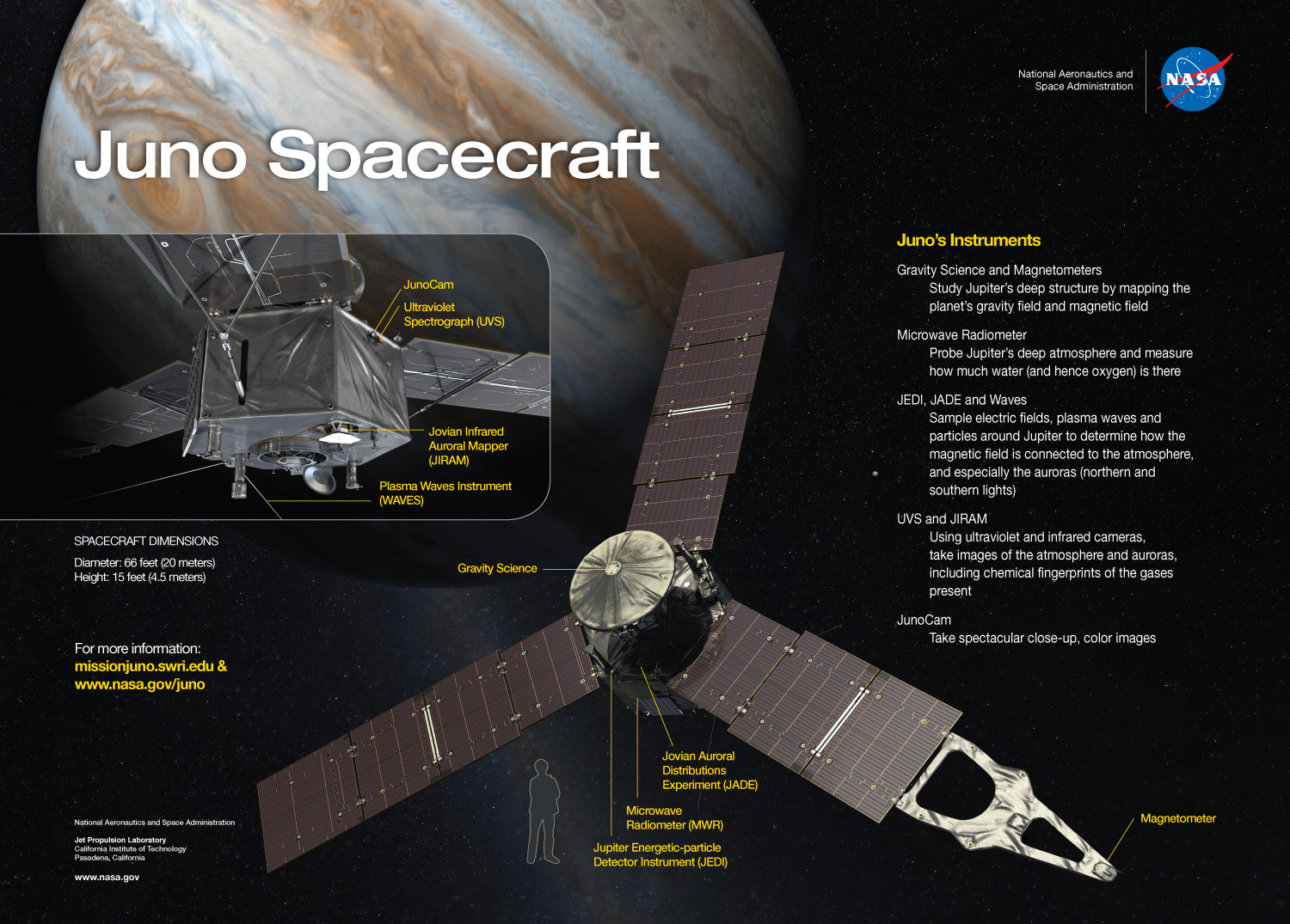

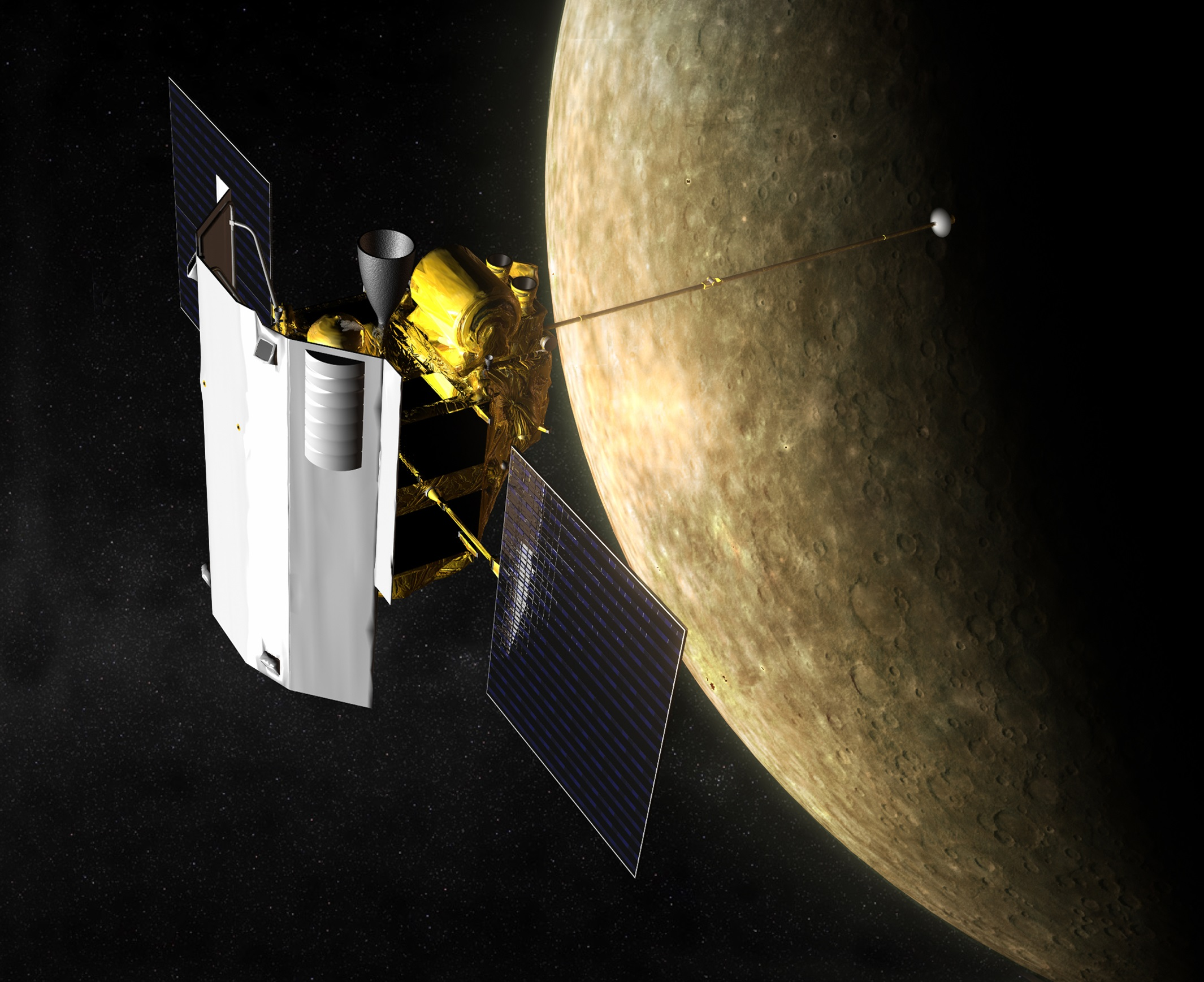

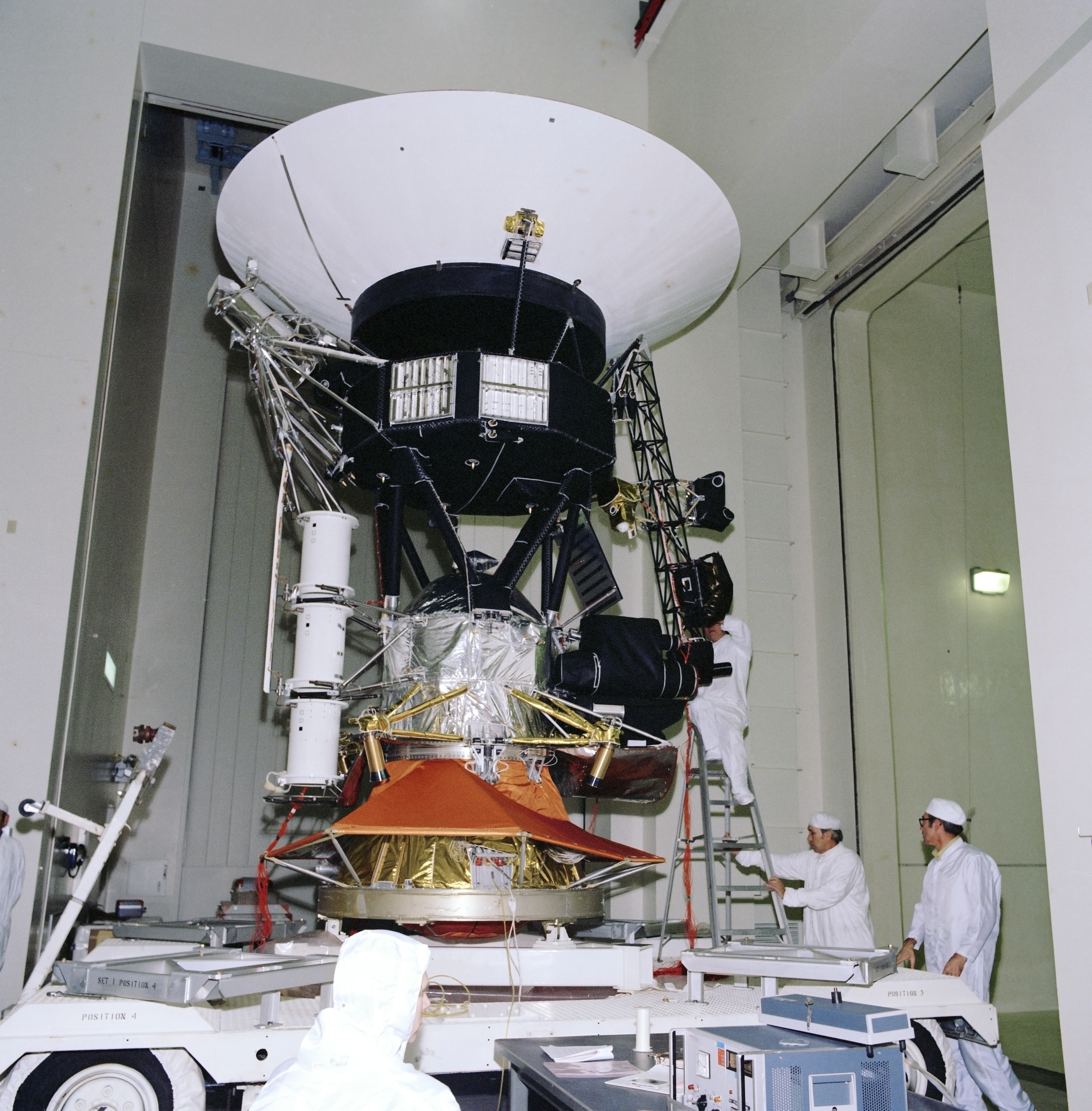

The most massive artificial objects to reach low Earth orbit or beyond including space stations. Spacecraft may change mass over time such as by use of propellant.

Currently the heaviest spacecraft is the International Space Station, nearly double Shuttle-Mir's mass in orbit. It began assembly with a first launch in 1998, however it only attained its full weight in the 2020s, due to its modular nature and gradual additions. Its mass can change significantly depending on what modules are added or removed.

During the Shuttle–Mir program between 1994 and 1998, the complex formed by the docking of a visiting Space Shuttle with Mir would temporarily make it the heaviest artificial object in orbit with a combined mass of 242 tonnes (238 long tons; 267 short tons) or 242,058 kg (533,647 lb) on STS-74 in a 1995 configuration.

== Selected spacecraft (by mass) ==
The following are a list of spacecraft with a mass greater than 8,000 kg (17,637 lb), or the top three to any other orbit including a planetary orbit, or the top three of a specific category of vehicle, or the heaviest vehicle from a specific nation. All numbers listed below for satellites use their mass at launch, if not otherwise stated.

| Name | Mass | Description | Orbit | State | In service from |
|---|---|---|---|---|---|
| International Space Station | 450,000 kg (992,080 lb) | Space station Listed mass includes attached vehicles and is estimated by ESA. Completed station mass is 419,725kg | LEO | In service | 1998– (at present size: 2021) |
| Ship 41 | 152,000 kg (335,103 lb) | Ship of SpaceX Starship. Mass is dry mass only including payload. First Ship to reach full orbit. | LEO | Deorbited 2026 | 2026 |
| Mir | 129,700 kg (285,940 lb) | Soviet / Russian space station | LEO | Deorbited 2001 | 1986–2001 |
| Space Shuttle Atlantis STS-117 | 122,683 kg (270,470 lb) | Heaviest flight of the Space Shuttle with S3/S4 truss. | LEO | Retired | 1985–2011 |
| Space Shuttle Columbia STS-93 | 122,534 kg (270,141 lb) | Chandra X-ray Observatory, launch | LEO | Lost | 1981–2003 |
| Space Shuttle Atlantis STS-115 | 122,397 kg (269,839 lb) | P3/P4 truss, assembly flight 12A | LEO | Retired | 1985–2011 |
| Buran | 105,000 kg (231,485 lb) | Soviet reusable orbiter of the Buran programme on flight 1K1. | LEO | Retired | 1988 |
| Tiangong | 102,000 kg (224,872 lb) | Chinese space station, with Tianzhou 5 & 6 attached. | LEO | In service | 2021– |
| Polyus | 80,000 kg (176,370 lb) | Prototype Soviet orbital weapons platform | Suborbital | Lost | 1987 |
| Skylab | 77,111 kg (170,001 lb) | U.S. space station; largest station orbited in one launch | LEO | Deorbited 1979 | 1973–1979 |
| Apollo 16 CSM+LM | 52,759 kg (116,314 lb) | Heaviest spacecraft sent to lunar orbit. First mission to land in Lunar Highlands. Command module is on display in Alabama | Moon | Retired | 1972 |
| Apollo 12 CSM+LM | 49,915 kg (110,044 lb) | LEM landed at Sinus Medii a small Lunar mare. Command module is on display in Virginia. | Moon | Retired | 1969 |
| Artemis 1 Orion CM + ESM | 25,861 kg (57,014 lb) | U.S. crewed spacecraft for entering lunar orbit | Moon | In service | 2022- |
| ATV-5 | 20,293 kg (44,738 lb) | European cargo spacecraft on its heaviest flight | LEO | Retired | 2008–2014 |
| Salyut 7 | 19,824 kg (43,704 lb) | USSR space station | LEO | Deorbited 1991 | 1982–1991 |
| KH-11 | 19,600 kg (43,211 lb) | Electro-optical reconnaissance satellite | SSO | In service | 1976– (current version: 2005–) |
| Salyut 1 | 18,425 kg (40,620 lb) | USSR space station | LEO | Deorbited 1971 | 1971–1971 |
| TKS | 17,510 kg (38,603 lb) | Soviet crewed spacecraft | LEO | Retired | 1977–1985 |
| Proton satellite | 17,000 kg (37,479 lb) | Space research satellite | LEO | Deorbited 1969 | 1965–1969 |
| Compton Gamma Ray Observatory | 16,329 kg (35,999 lb) | Space observatory | LEO | Deorbited 2000 | 1991–2000 |
| Lacrosse | 14,500 kg (31,967 lb)- 16,000 kg (35,274 lb) | Radar imaging reconnaissance satellite | SSO | Retired; Lacrosse 5 still in orbit | 1988–2005 |
| Hubble Space Telescope | 11,110 kg (24,493 lb) | Space observatory | LEO | In service | 1990– |
| Jupiter-3 (EchoStar-24) | 9,200 kg (20,283 lb) | Communications satellite | GEO | In service | 2023– |
| Tiangong-2 | 8,600 kg (18,960 lb) | Chinese space station | LEO | Deorbited 2019 | 2016–2019 |
| Tiangong-1 | 8,506 kg (18,753 lb) | Chinese space station | LEO | Deorbited 2018 | 2011–2016 |
| Chang'e 6 | 8,350 kg (18,409 lb) | Chinese lunar sample return | Moon | In service | 2024– |
| Envisat | 8,211 kg (18,102 lb) | Earth observing satellite Kessler syndrome threat | LEO | In orbit, inoperable | 2002–2012 |
| Chang'e 5 | 8,200 kg (18,078 lb) | Chinese lunar sample return | Moon | In service | 2020– |
| Shijian-20 | 8,000 kg (17,637 lb) | Communication Technology Test Satellite | GEO | In service | 2019– |
| Telstar 19V | 7,075 kg (15,598 lb) | Communications satellite | GEO | In service | 2018– |
| TerreStar-1 | 6,910 kg (15,234 lb) | Communications satellite | GEO | In service | 2009– |
| EchoStar XXI | 6,871 kg (15,148 lb) | Communications satellite | GEO | In service | 2017– |
| UARS | 6,540 kg (14,418 lb) | Earth science | LEO | Deorbited 2011 | 1991–2005 |
| James Webb Space Telescope | 6,500 kg (14,330 lb) | Space observatory | Sun-Earth L2 | In service | 2021– |
| Phobos 1 | 6,220 kg (13,713 lb) | Soviet Mars Spacecraft that missed its orbital insertion burn | Solar Orbit | Lost contact 1988 | 1988 |
| Europa Clipper | 6,065 kg (13,371 lb) | Jupiter and Europa science probe with an ETA in 2030. | Solar Orbit on route to Jupiter | In service | 2024– |
| Jupiter Icy Moons Explorer | 5,963 kg (13,146 lb) | Jupiter science probe and Ganymede orbiter with an ETA in 2031. | Solar Orbit on route to Ganymede | In service | 2023– |
| BlueBird Block-2 Mission | 5908 Kg (13,025 lb) | BlueBird Block-2 communication satellite of AST SpaceMobile, USA. Heaviest satellite launched from Indian soil. | LEO | In Service | 2025 |
| Falcon Heavy test flight | 5,900 kg (13,007 lb) | Maiden flight of Falcon Heavy with Elon Musk's Tesla Roadster, COSPAR 2018-017A | Solar Orbit | Lost contact 2018 | 2018 |
| Chandra X-ray Obs. | 5,865 kg (12,930 lb) | Space observatory | HEO | In service | 1999– |
| GSAT-11 | 5,854 kg (12,906 lb) | Heaviest Indian communications satellite | GEO | In service | 2018– |
| Cassini-Huygens | 5,655 kg (12,467 lb) | Saturn orbiter and Titan probe | Saturn | Deorbited 2017 | 1997–2017 |
| Venera 15 & 16 | 5,300 kg (11,684 lb) | Venus orbiter | Venus | Retired | 1983–1985 |
| Venera 10 | 5,033 kg (11,096 lb) | Venus orbiter & lander | Venus | Last contact 1976 | 1975–1976 |
| Tianwen-1 | 5,000 kg (11,023 lb) | Tianwen-1 Mars orbiter, deployable and remote cameras, lander and Zhurong rover | Mars | In service | 2021– |
| Terra | 4,864 kg (10,723 lb) | Earth observing satellite | SSO | In service | 1999– |
| Mars 2 | 4,650 kg (10,251 lb) | Soviet Mars orbiter and lander | Mars | Retired | 1971–1972 |
| GSAT-7R | 4,410 kg (9,722 lb) | Heaviest Indian Satellite launched from Indian soil | GEO | In service | 2025- |
| ExoMars Trace Gas Orbiter | 4,332 kg (9,550 lb) | Mars orbiter (including Schiaparelli EDM lander) | Mars | In service | 2016– |
| GSAT-24 | 4,181 kg (9,218 lb) | Indian Communication Satellite | GEO | In service | 2022- |
| Chandrayaan-3 | 3900 kg (8,598 lb) | Lunar Lander-rover | Moon | In service | 2023- |
| GPS IIIA | 3,880 kg (8,554 lb) | Current GPS satellite series | MEO | In service | 2018– |
| Chandrayaan-2 | 3,850 kg (8,487 lb) | Lunar Orbiter-Lander-Rover | Moon | In service | 2019- |
| Spektr-R (RadioAstron) | 3,660 kg (8,069 lb) | Space observatory | HEO | In service | 2011– |
| Juno | 3,625 kg (7,992 lb) | Jupiter orbiter | Jupiter | In service | 2011– |
| Viking 1 | 3,530 kg (7,782 lb) | USA Mars orbiter and lander | Mars | Retired | 1975–1982 |
| Magellan (spacecraft) | 3,449 kg (7,604 lb) | Venus orbiter from USA | Venus | Deorbited 1994 | 1989–1994 |
| Herschel | 3,400 kg (7,496 lb) | Space observatory | Sun-Earth L2 | Retired | 2009–2013 |
| Galileo | 2,562 kg (5,648 lb) | Jupiter orbiter and probe | Jupiter | Deorbited 2003 | 1989–2003 |
| MAVEN | 2,454 kg (5,410 lb) | Mars orbiter | Mars | In service | 2013– |
| Apollo 10 LM AS "Snoopy" | 2,169 kg (4,782 lb) | Snoopy's ascent stage was sent into orbit around the Sun. Dry mass of the ascent stage is listed. | Solar Orbit | Retired | 1969 |
| Lunar Reconnaissance Orbiter | 1,846 kg (4,070 lb) | Lunar orbiter | Moon | In service | 2009– |
| Lucy (spacecraft) | 1,550 kg (3,417 lb) | Asteroid space probe launched by USA | Solar Orbit | In service | 2021– |
| Astrosat | 1,513 kg (3,336 lb) | Space observatory from India | LEO | In service | 2015– |
| Mars Orbiter Mission | 1,337.2 kg (2,948 lb) | India's first Mars mission | Mars | Retired | 2013–2022 |
| Venus Express | 1,270 kg (2,800 lb) | Venus orbiter from ESA | Venus | Deorbited 2015 | 2005–2014 |
| MESSENGER | 1,093 kg (2,410 lb) | Mercury orbiter | Mercury | Deorbited 2015 | 2011–2015 |
| Voyager 1 / Voyager 2 | 815 kg (1,797 lb) | Outer planets / interstellar space | Solar Escape | In service | 1977– |
| New Horizons | 465 kg (1,025 lb) | Pluto/Kuiper belt probe | Solar Escape | In service | 2006– |
| Malligyong-1 | 300 kg (661 lb) | Heaviest North Korean reconnaissance satellite, 21 Nov 2023 launch | SSO | In service | 2023– |
| Capstone | 25 kg (55 lb) | Lunar Orbiter | Moon | In service | 2022– |
| MarCO | 13.5 kg (30 lb) each | Mars Flyby | Mars | Lost contact 2019 | 2018–2019 |

== Spacecraft design families (by mass) ==
List of spacecraft families (by mass) with 2 or more flights into space and over 7000kg.

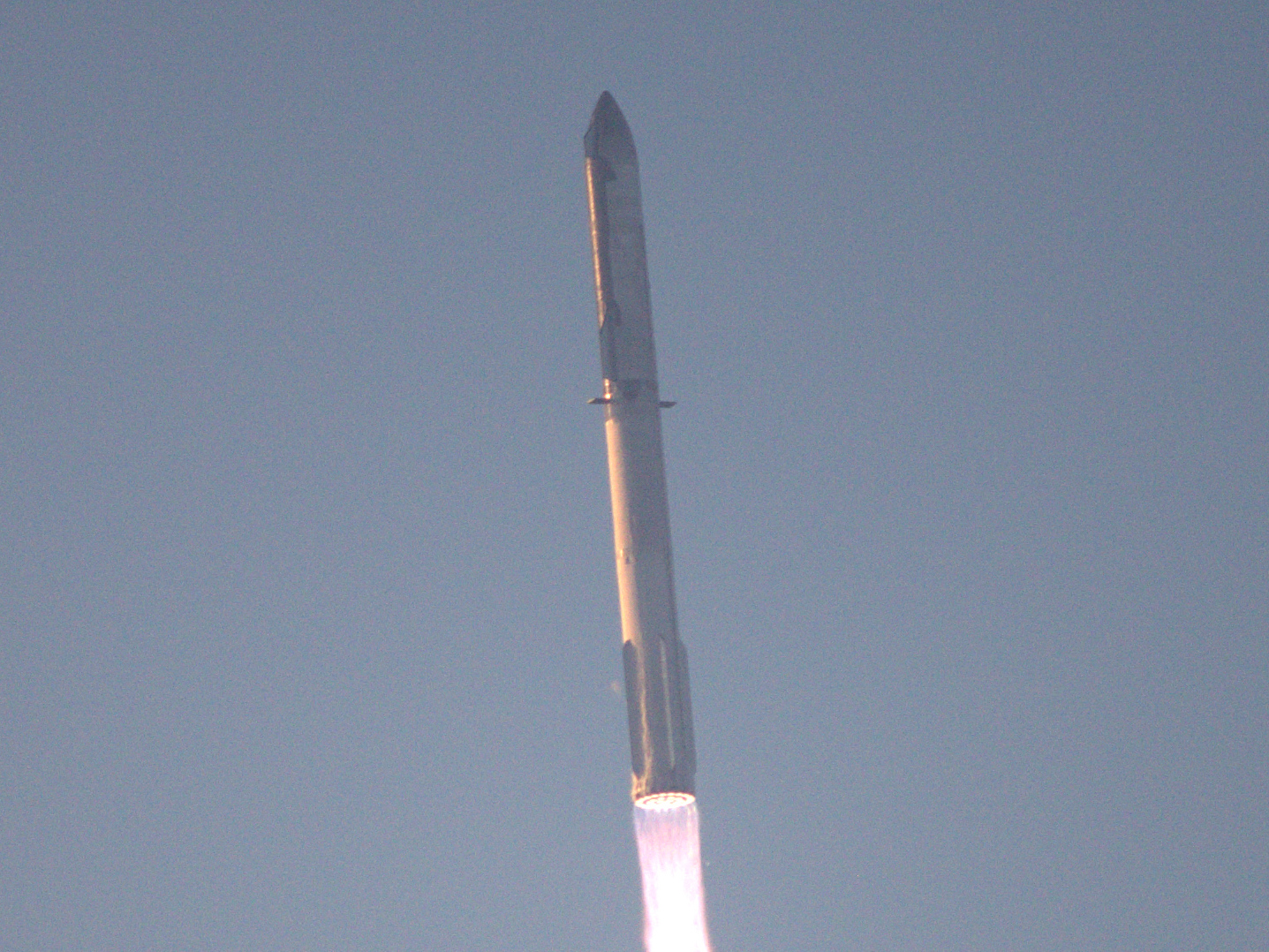

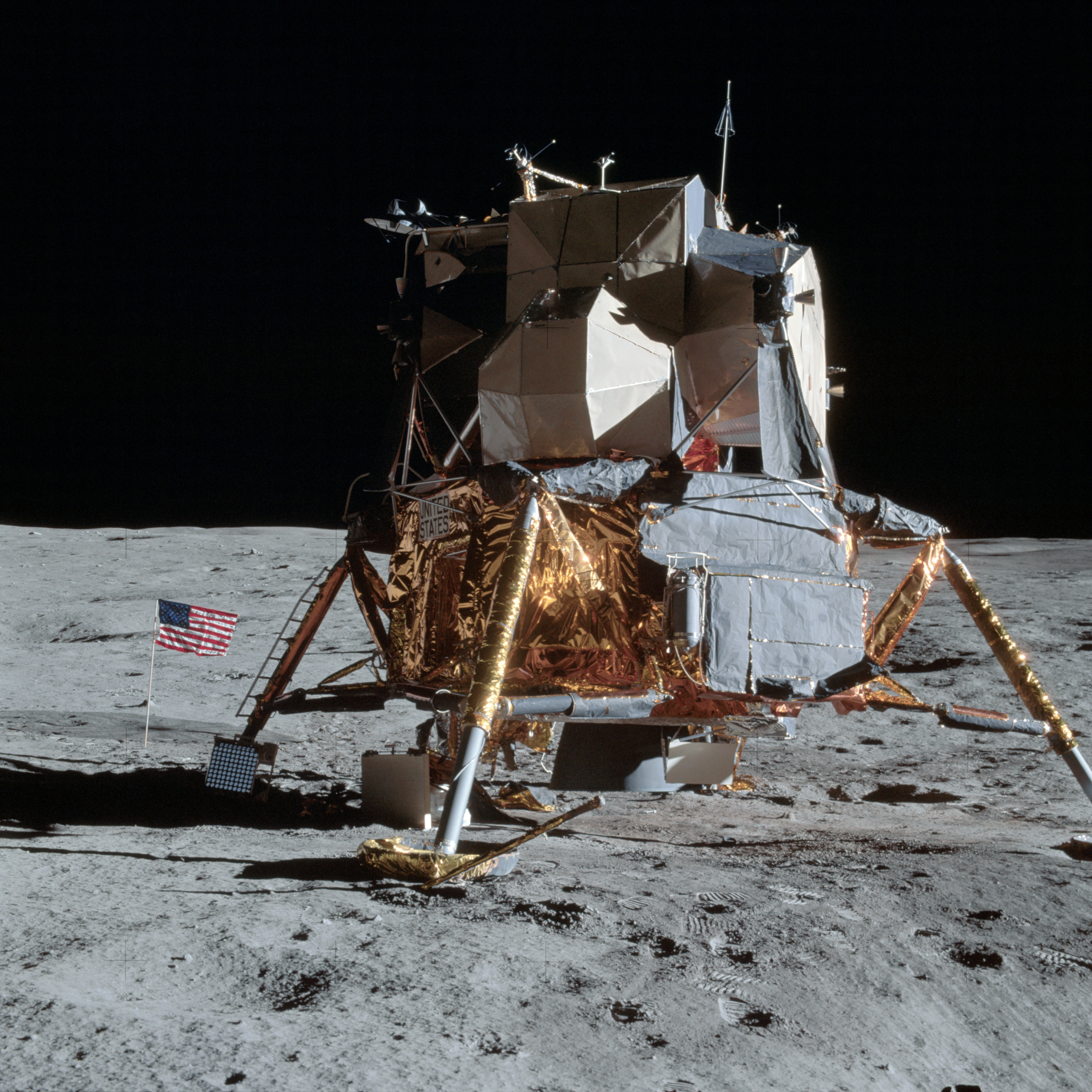

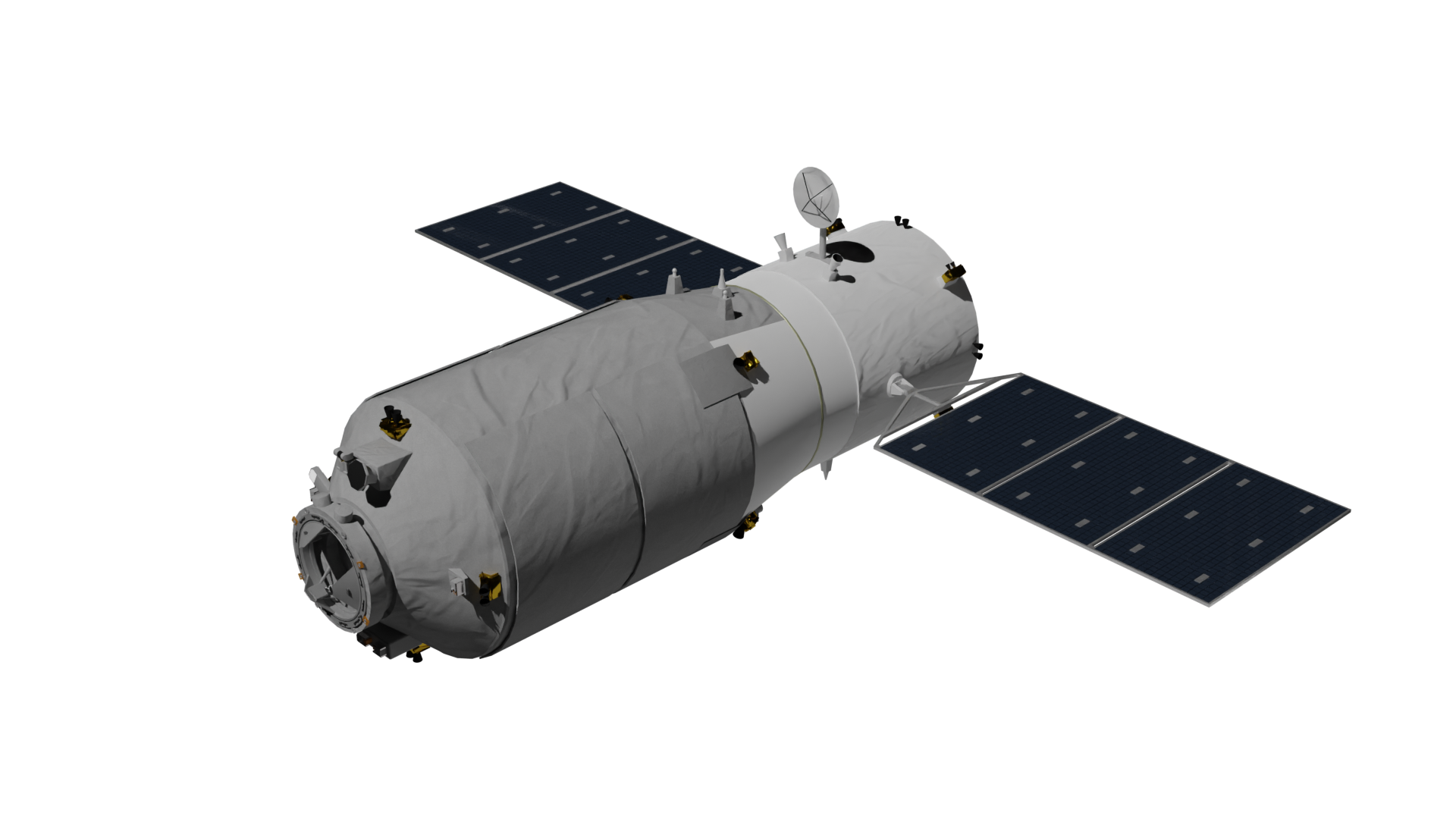

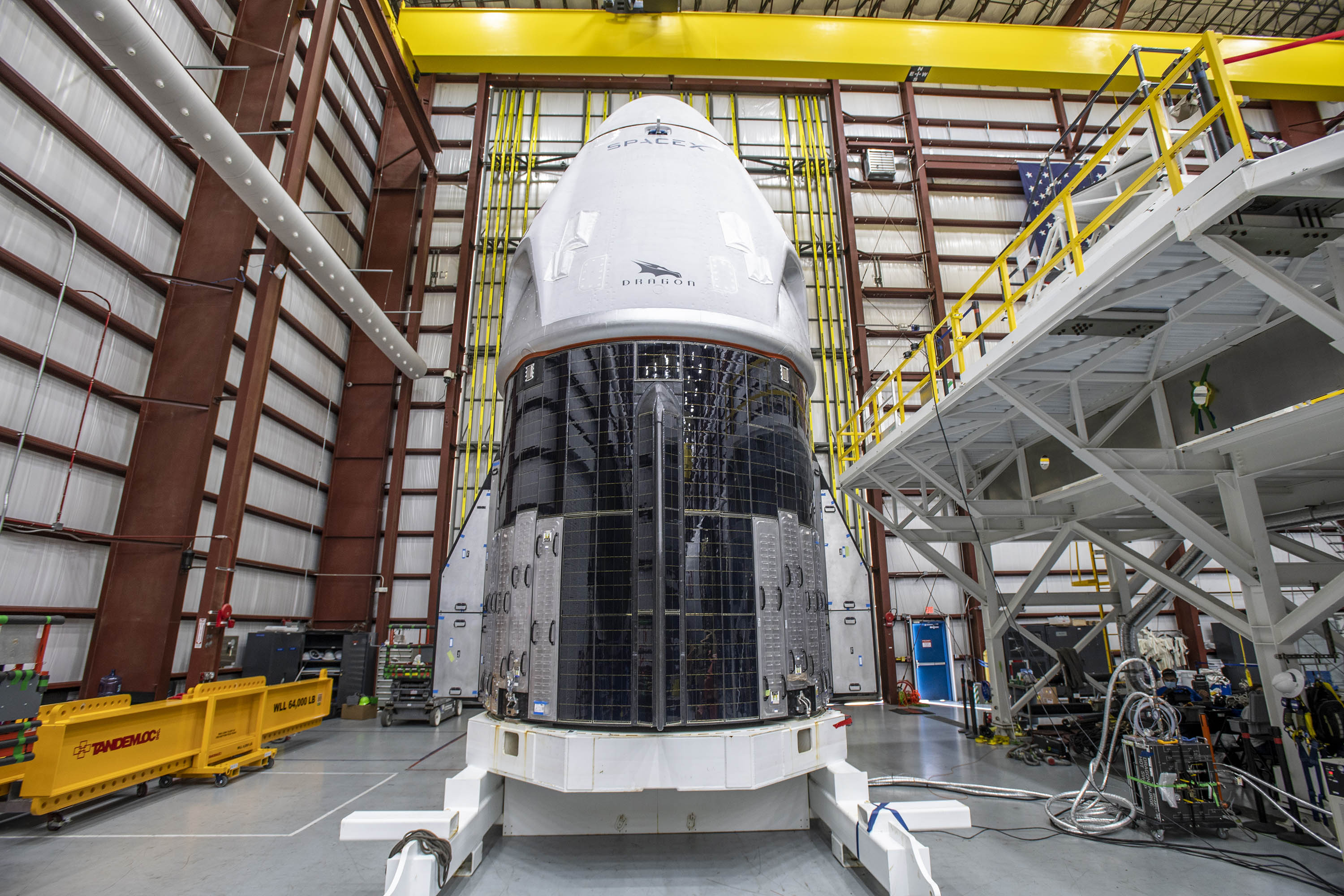

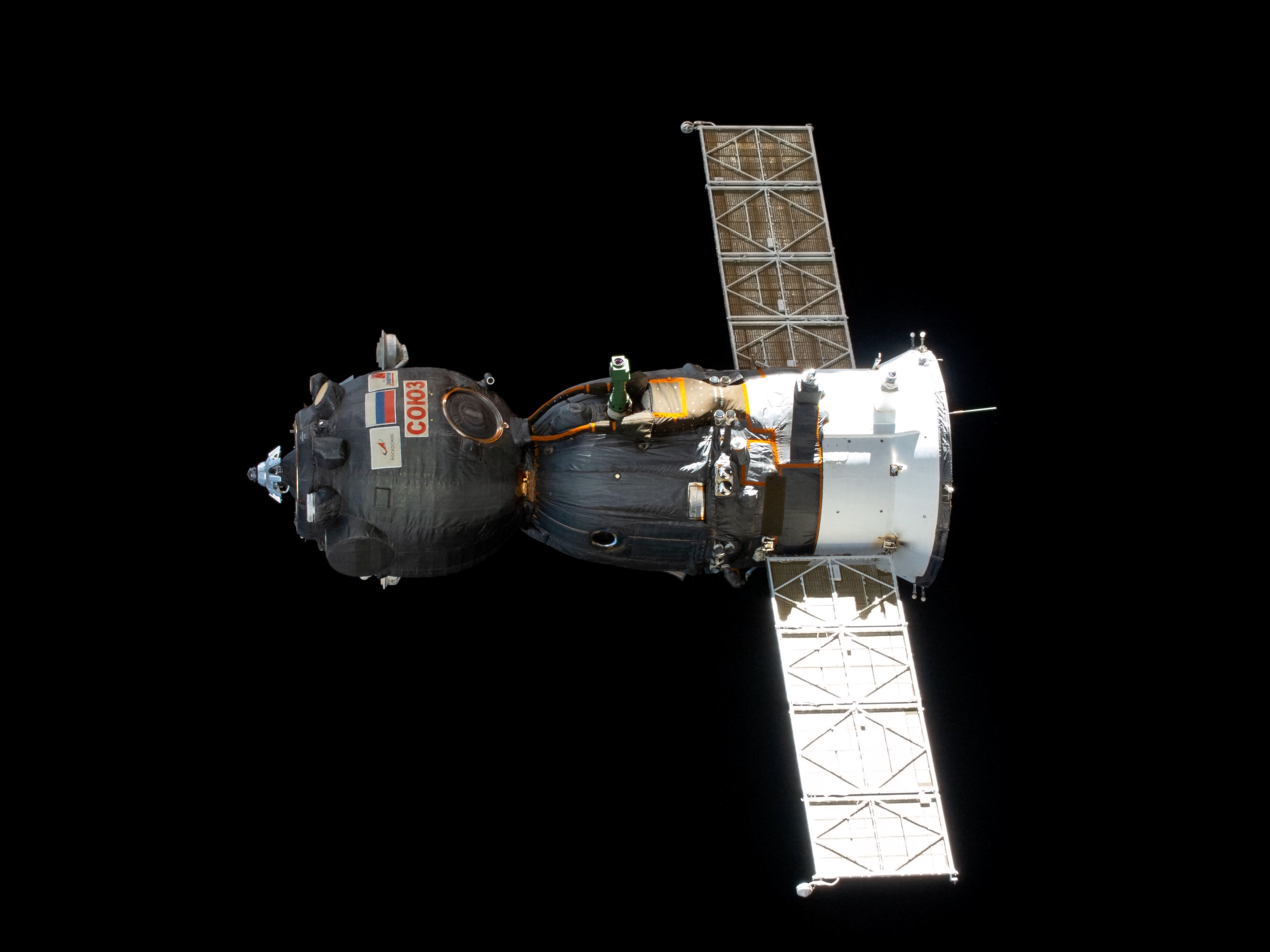

| Name | Mass | Description | Orbit | State | In service from |
|---|---|---|---|---|---|
| Starship | 200,650 kg (442,358 lb) | Mass includes 100 tons of remaining propellant. Mass is a very rough estimate and probably high. Ship 41 attained orbit with 26 Starlink v3 satellites. | LEO | In service | 2020– |
| Space Shuttle orbiter | 122,683 kg (270,470 lb) | Space Shuttle Atlantis on STS-117, the heaviest flight of the Space Shuttle. | LEO | Retired | 1981–2011 |
| Apollo CSM | 28,800 kg (63,493 lb) | U.S. crewed spacecraft for entering lunar orbit | Moon | Retired | 1968–1975 (Block II) |
| Orion Multi-Purpose Crew Vehicle | 26,520 kg (58,467 lb) | U.S. crewed spacecraft for entering lunar orbit | Moon | In service | 2022- |
| ATV | 20,293 kg (44,738 lb) | European cargo spacecraft on its heaviest flight | LEO | Retired | 2008–2014 |
| Apollo Lunar Module | 16,400 kg (36,156 lb) | U.S. crewed lunar lander | Moon | Retired | 1968–1972 |
| Tianzhou | 14,000 kg (30,865 lb) | Chinese automated cargo spacecraft | LEO | In service | 2017– |
| Crew Dragon | 12,519 kg (27,600 lb) | SpaceX crewed spacecraft | LEO | In service | 2019– |
| Soyuz | 7,080 kg (15,609 lb) | Russian crewed spacecraft (latest revision used for mass) | LEO | In service | 1967– (variants) 2016– (Soyuz MS) |

== See also ==
- List of large reentering space debris
- Lists of spacecraft
