= Compton Gamma Ray Observatory =

NASA space observatory designed to detect X-rays and gamma rays (1991–2000)

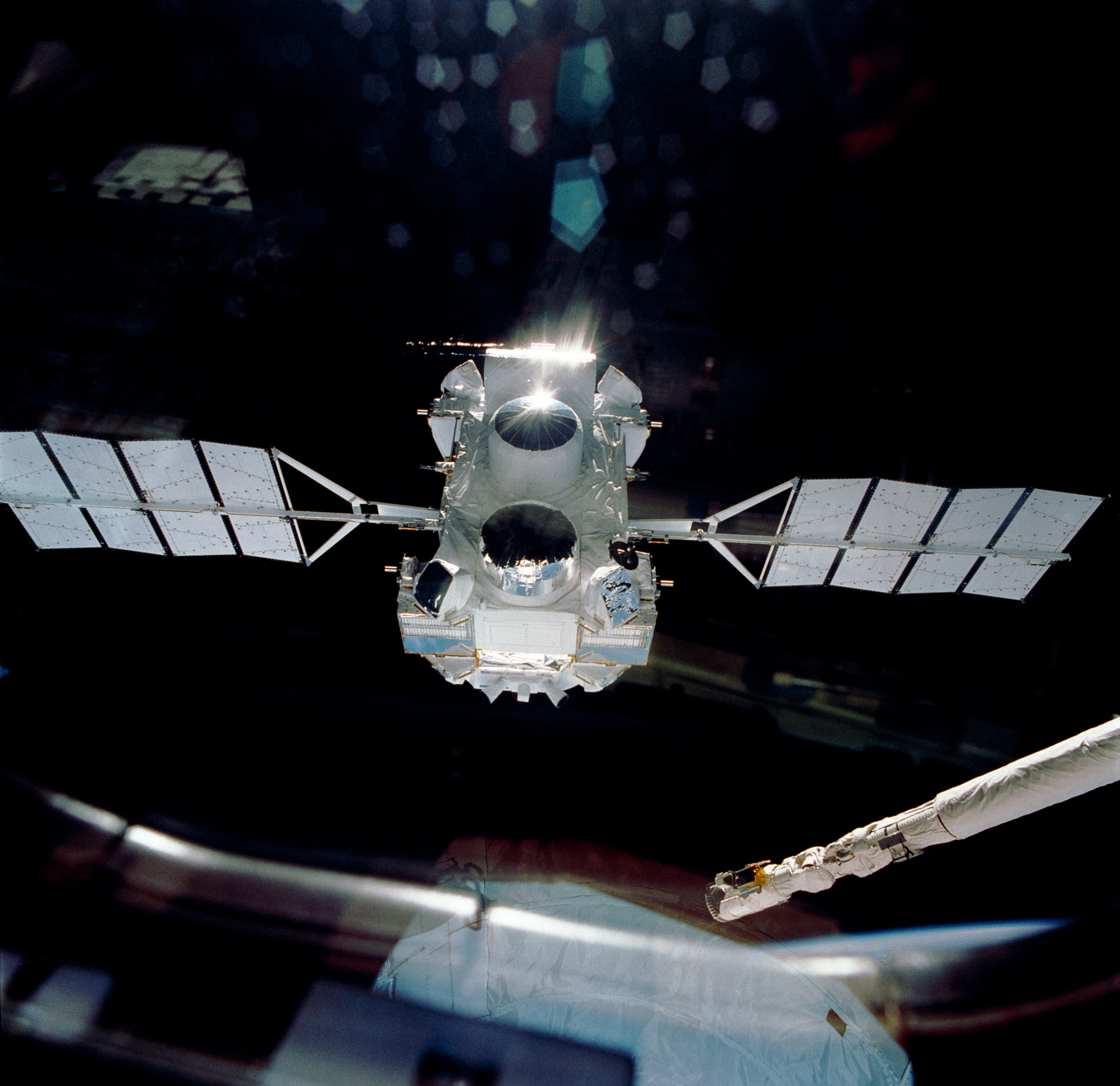
- CGRO deployed in 1991
- Mission type: Astronomy
- Operator: NASA
- COSPAR ID: 1991-027B
- SATCAT no.: 21225
- Website: heasarc.gsfc.nasa.gov/docs/cgro/cossc/
- Mission duration: 9 years, 2 months

Spacecraft properties
- Manufacturer: TRW Inc.
- Launch mass: 16,329 kilograms (35,999 lb)
- Power: 2000 Watts

Start of mission
- Launch date: 5 April 1991, 14:22:45 UTC
- Rocket: Space Shuttle Atlantis; STS-37
- Launch site: Kennedy LC-39B

End of mission
- Decay date: 4 June 2000, 23:29:55 UTC

Orbital parameters
- Reference system: Geocentric
- Regime: Low Earth
- Eccentricity: 0.006998
- Perigee altitude: 362 kilometres (225 mi)
- Apogee altitude: 457 kilometres (284 mi)
- Inclination: 28.4610 degrees
- Period: 91.59 minutes
- RAAN: 68.6827 degrees
- Epoch: 7 April 1991, 18:37:00 UTC

Main Telescopes (Four)
- Type: Scintillation detectors
- Focal length: Varied by instrument
- Collecting area: Varied by instrument
- Wavelengths: X-ray to γ-ray, 20 keV – 30 GeV (40 pm – 60 am)
Instruments
- BATSE: Burst and Transient Source Experiment
- OSSE: Oriented Scintillation Spectrometer Experiment
- COMPTEL: Imaging Compton Telescope
- EGRET: Energetic Gamma Ray Experiment Telescope

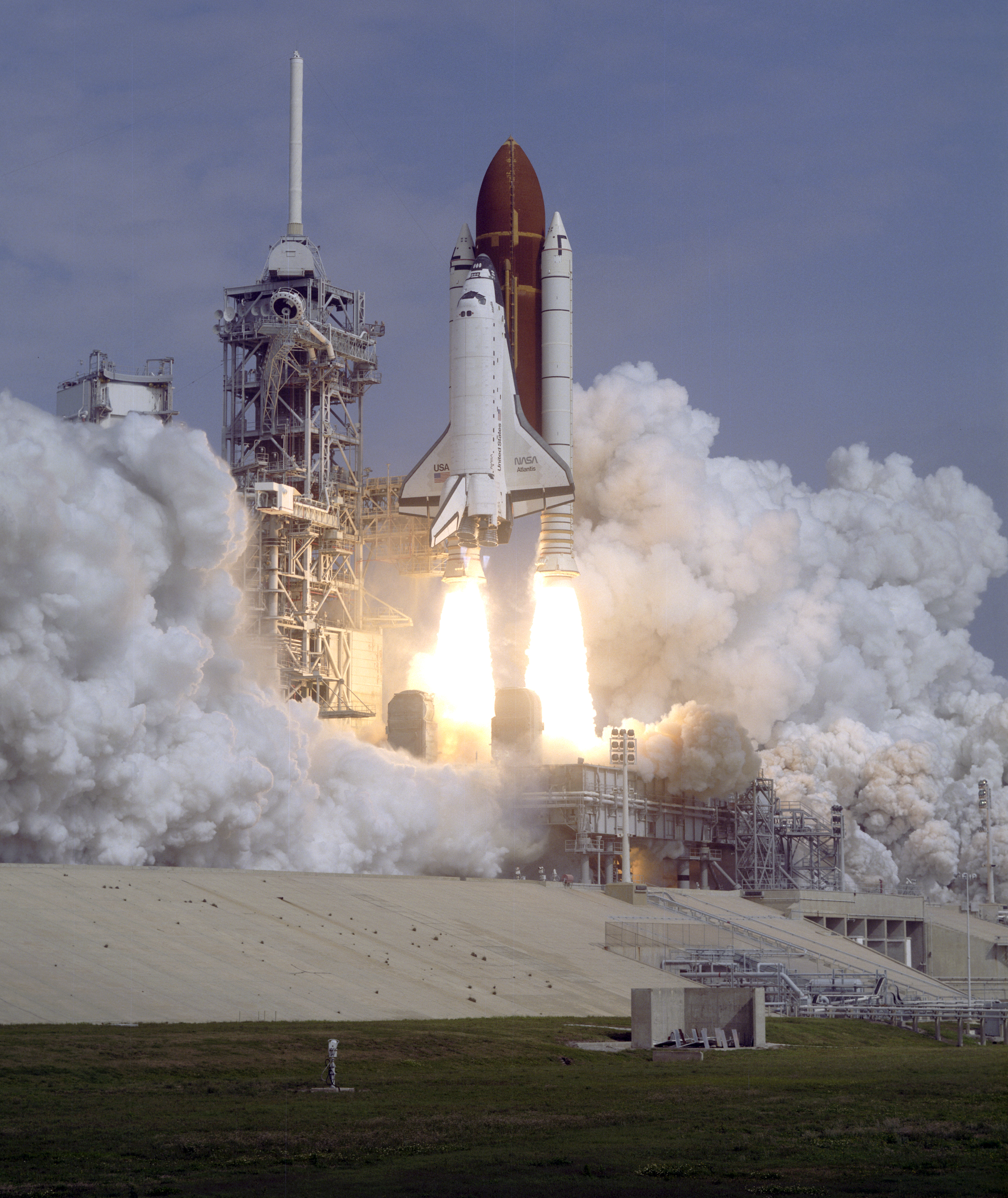
Launch of Space Shuttle Atlantis carrying the observatory to Earth orbit (STS-37)

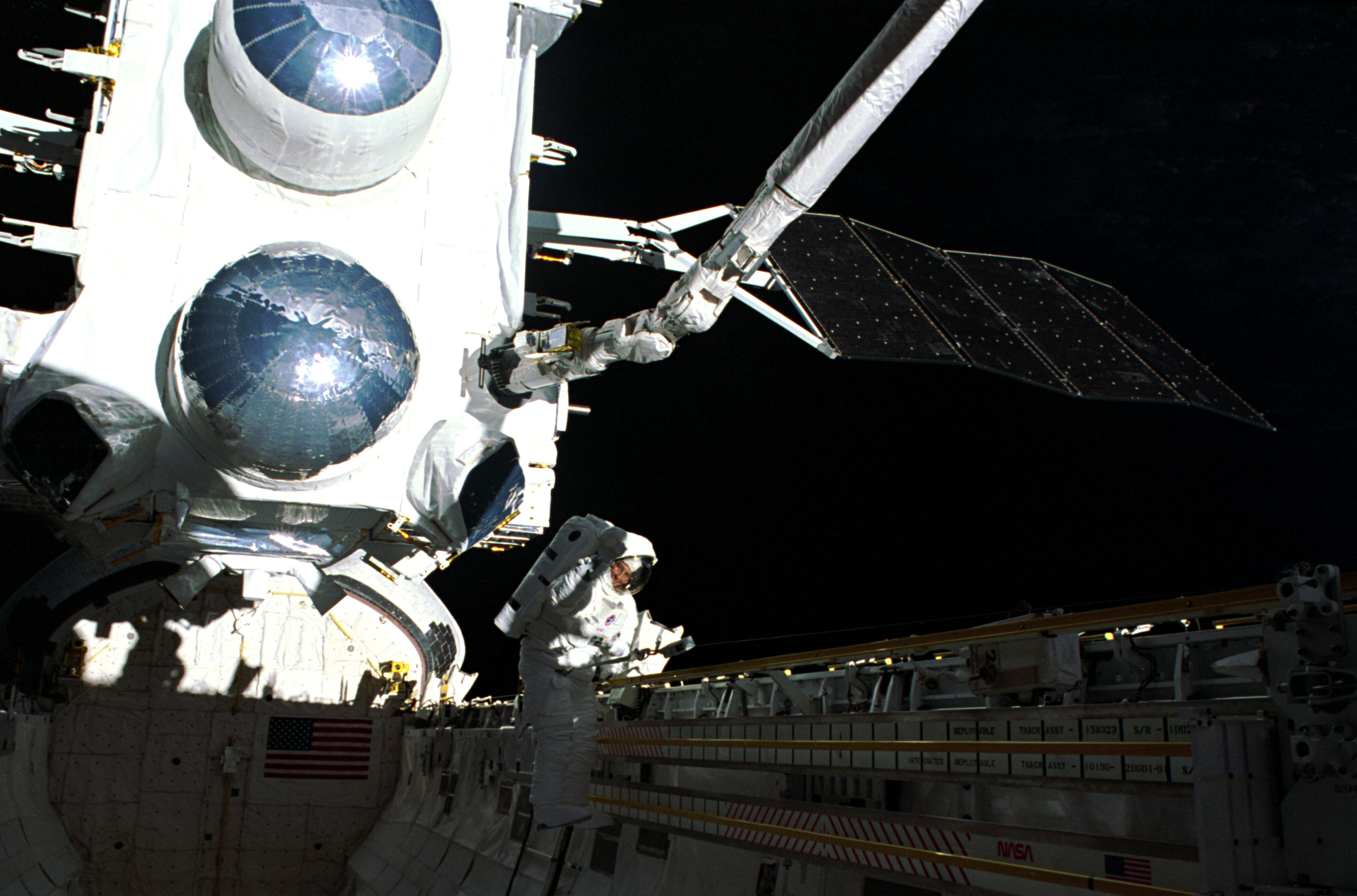
Astronaut Jay Apt in the Space Shuttle bay with the observatory partially deployed but still attached to the Shuttle's robotic arm

The Compton Gamma Ray Observatory (CGRO) was a space observatory detecting photons with energies from 20 keV to 30 GeV, in Earth orbit from 1991 to 2000. The observatory featured four main telescopes in one spacecraft, covering X-rays and gamma rays, including various specialized sub-instruments and detectors. Following 14 years of effort, the observatory was launched from Space Shuttle Atlantis during STS-37 on April 5, 1991, and operated until its deorbit on June 4, 2000. It was deployed in low Earth orbit at 450 km (280 mi) to avoid the Van Allen radiation belt. It was the heaviest astrophysical payload ever flown at that time at 16,300 kilograms (35,900 lb).

Costing $617 million, the CGRO was part of NASA's Great Observatories series, along with the Hubble Space Telescope, the Chandra X-ray Observatory, and the Spitzer Space Telescope. It was the second of the series to be launched into space, following the Hubble Space Telescope. The CGRO was named after Arthur Compton, an American physicist and former chancellor of Washington University in St. Louis who received the Nobel Prize for work involved with gamma-ray physics. CGRO was built by TRW (now Northrop Grumman Aerospace Systems) in Redondo Beach, California. CGRO was an international collaboration and additional contributions came from the European Space Agency and various universities, as well as the U.S. Naval Research Laboratory.

Successors to CGRO include the ESA INTEGRAL spacecraft (2002–2025), NASA Swift Gamma-Ray Burst Mission (launched 2004), ASI AGILE (2007–2024) and NASA Fermi Gamma-ray Space Telescope (launched 2008); Swift and Fermi remain operational as of August 2025.

== Instruments ==
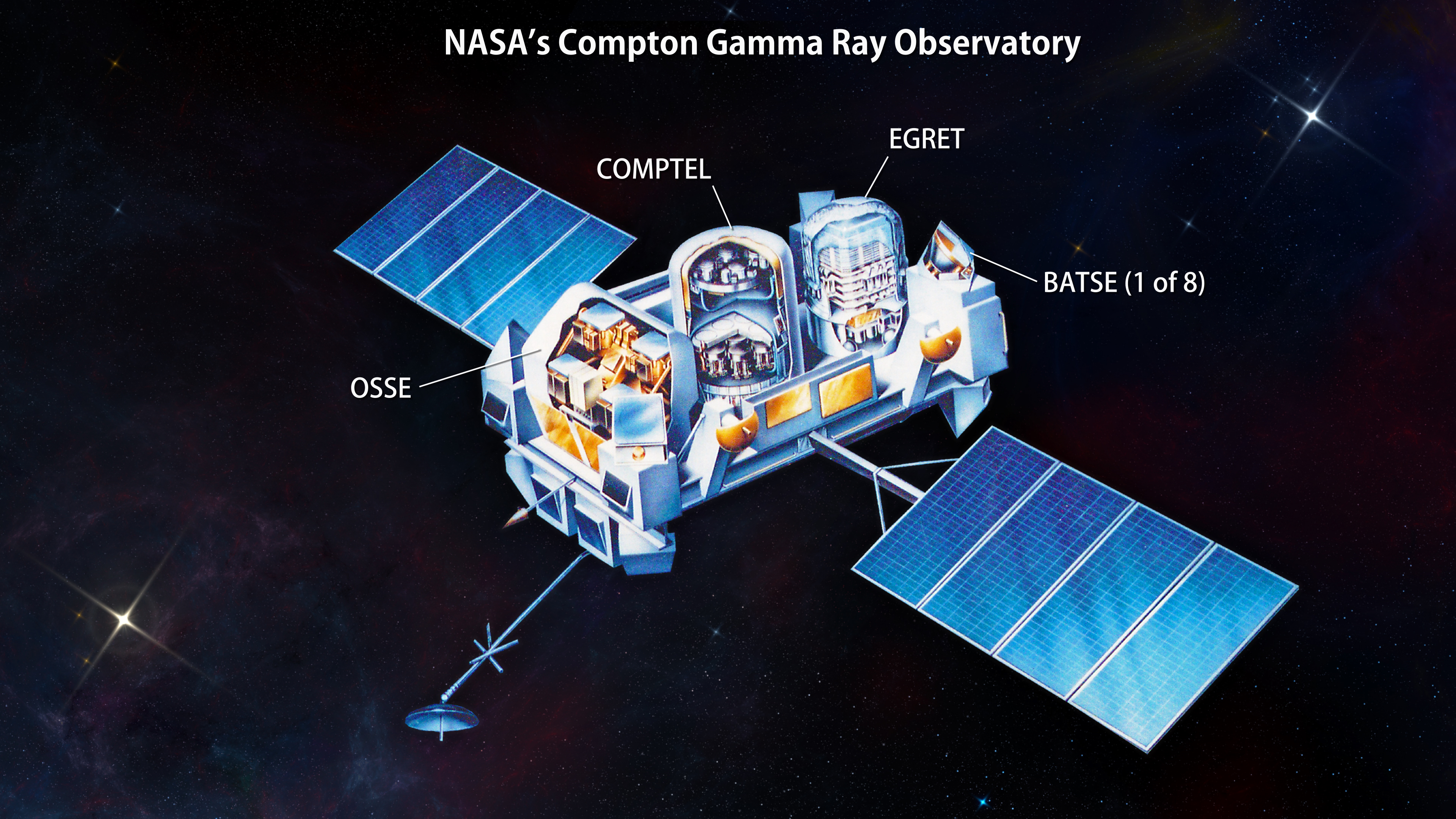
Compton Gamma Ray Observatory cutaway

CGRO carried a complement of four instruments that covered an unprecedented six orders of the electromagnetic spectrum, from 20 keV to 30 GeV (from 0.02 MeV to 30000 MeV). Those are presented below in order of increasing spectral energy coverage:

=== BATSE ===
The Burst and Transient Source Experiment (BATSE) by NASA's Marshall Space Flight Center searched the sky for gamma-ray bursts (20 to >600 keV) and conducted full-sky surveys for long-lived sources. It consisted of eight identical detector modules, one at each of the satellite's corners. Each module consisted of both a NaI(Tl) Large Area Detector (LAD) covering the 20 keV to ~2 MeV range, 50.48 cm in dia by 1.27 cm thick, and a 12.7 cm dia by 7.62 cm thick NaI Spectroscopy Detector, which extended the upper energy range to 8 MeV, all surrounded by a plastic scintillator in active anti-coincidence to veto the large background rates due to cosmic rays and trapped radiation. Sudden increases in the LAD rates triggered a high-speed data storage mode, the details of the burst being read out to telemetry later. Bursts were typically detected at rates of roughly one per day over the 9-year CGRO mission. A strong burst could result in the observation of many thousands of gamma-rays within a time interval ranging from ~0.1 s up to about 100 s.

=== OSSE ===
The Oriented Scintillation Spectrometer Experiment (OSSE) by the Naval Research Laboratory detected gamma rays entering the field of view of any of four detector modules, which could be pointed individually, and were effective in the 0.05 to 10 MeV range. Each detector had a central scintillation spectrometer crystal of NaI(Tl) 12 in (303 mm) in diameter, by 4 in (102 mm) thick, optically coupled at the rear to a 3 in (76.2 mm) thick CsI(Na) crystal of similar diameter, viewed by seven photomultiplier tubes, operated as a phoswich: i.e., particle and gamma-ray events from the rear produced slow-rise time (~1 μs) pulses, which could be electronically distinguished from pure NaI events from the front, which produced faster (~0.25 μs) pulses. Thus the CsI backing crystal acted as an active anticoincidence shield, vetoing events from the rear. A further barrel-shaped CsI shield, also in electronic anticoincidence, surrounded the central detector on the sides and provided coarse collimation, rejecting gamma rays and charged particles from the sides or most of the forward field-of-view (FOV). A finer level of angular collimation was provided by a tungsten slat collimator grid within the outer CsI barrel, which collimated the response to a 3.8° x 11.4° FWHM rectangular FOV. A plastic scintillator across the front of each module vetoed charged particles entering from the front. The four detectors were typically operated in pairs of two. During a gamma-ray source observation, one detector would take observations of the source, while the other would slew slightly off source to measure the background levels. The two detectors would routinely switch roles, allowing for more accurate measurements of both the source and background. The instruments could slew with a speed of approximately 2 degrees per second.

=== COMPTEL ===
The Imaging Compton Telescope (COMPTEL) by the Max Planck Institute for Extraterrestrial Physics, the University of New Hampshire, Netherlands Institute for Space Research, and ESA's Astrophysics Division was tuned to the 0.75–30 MeV energy range and determined the angle of arrival of photons to within a degree and the energy to within five percent at higher energies. The instrument had a field of view of one steradian. For cosmic gamma-ray events, the experiment required two nearly simultaneous interactions, in a set of front and rear scintillators. Gamma rays would Compton scatter in a forward detector module, where the interaction energy E_{1}, given to the recoil electron was measured, while the Compton scattered photon would then be caught in one of the second layers of scintillators to the rear, where its total energy, E_{2}, would be measured. From these two energies, E_{1} and E_{2}, the Compton scattering angle, angle θ, can be determined, along with the total energy, E_{1} + E_{2}, of the incident photon. The positions of the interactions, in both the front and rear scintillators, was also measured. The vector, V, connecting the two interaction points determined a direction to the sky, and the angle θ about this direction, defined a cone about V on which the source of the photon must lie, and a corresponding "event circle" on the sky. Because of the requirement for a near coincidence between the two interactions, with the correct delay of a few nanoseconds, most modes of background production were strongly suppressed. From the collection of many event energies and event circles, a map of the positions of sources, along with their photon fluxes and spectra, could be determined.

=== EGRET ===
Instruments
Instrument	Observing
BATSE	0.02–8 MeV
OSSE	0.05–10 MeV
COMPTEL	0.75–30 MeV
EGRET	20–30 000 MeV

The Energetic Gamma Ray Experiment Telescope (EGRET) measured high energy (20 MeV to 30 GeV) gamma-ray source positions to a fraction of a degree and photon energy to within 15 percent. EGRET was developed by NASA Goddard Space Flight Center, the Max Planck Institute for Extraterrestrial Physics, and Stanford University. Its detector operated on the principle of electron-positron pair production from high energy photons interacting in the detector. The tracks of the high-energy electron and positron created were measured within the detector volume, and the axis of the V of the two emerging particles projected to the sky. Finally, their total energy was measured in a large calorimeter scintillation detector at the rear of the instrument.

== Results ==
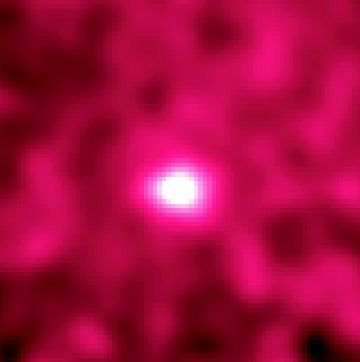
The Moon as seen by the Compton Gamma Ray Observatory, in gamma rays of greater than 20 MeV. These are produced by cosmic ray bombardment of its surface. The Sun, which has no similar surface of high atomic number to act as target for cosmic rays, cannot be seen at all at these energies, which are too high to emerge from primary nuclear reactions, such as solar nuclear fusion.

=== Basic results ===
- The EGRET instrument conducted the first all sky survey above 100 MeV. Using four years of data it discovered 271 sources, 170 of which were unidentified.
- The COMPTEL instrument completed an all sky map of ^{26}Al (a radioactive isotope of aluminum).
- The OSSE instrument completed the most comprehensive survey of the galactic center, and discovered a possible antimatter "cloud" above the center.
- The BATSE instrument averaged one gamma ray burst event detection per day for a total of approximately 2700 detections. It definitively showed that the majority of gamma-ray bursts must originate in distant galaxies, not nearby in our own Milky Way, and therefore must be enormously energetic.
- The discovery of the first four soft gamma ray repeaters; these sources were relatively weak, mostly below 100 keV and had unpredictable periods of activity and inactivity
- The separation of GRBs into two time profiles: short duration GRBs that last less than 2 seconds, and long duration GRBs that last longer than this.

=== GRB 990123 ===
Gamma ray burst 990123 (23 January 1999) was one of the brightest bursts recorded at the time, and was the first GRB with an optical afterglow observed during the prompt gamma ray emission (a reverse shock flash). This allowed astronomers to measure a redshift of 1.6 and a distance of 3.2 Gpc. Combining the measured energy of the burst in gamma-rays and the distance, the total emitted energy assuming an isotropic explosion could be deduced and resulted in the direct conversion of approximately two solar masses into energy. This finally convinced the community that GRB afterglows resulted from highly collimated explosions, which strongly reduced the needed energy budget.

=== Miscellaneous results ===
- The completion of both a pulsar survey and a supernova remnant survey
- The discovery of terrestrial gamma ray sources in 1994 that came from thunderclouds

== History ==
Proposal
Work started in 1977.

Funding and Development
CGRO was designed for in-orbit refuelling/servicing.

Construction and test

Launch and Commissioning
Launched 7 April 1991. Fuel line problems were found soon after launch which discouraged frequent orbital reboosts.

Communications

Loss of data tape recorder, and mitigation
Onboard data recorders failed in 1992 which reduced the amount of data that could be downlinked. Another TDRS ground station was built to reduce the gaps in data collection.

=== Orbital re-boost ===
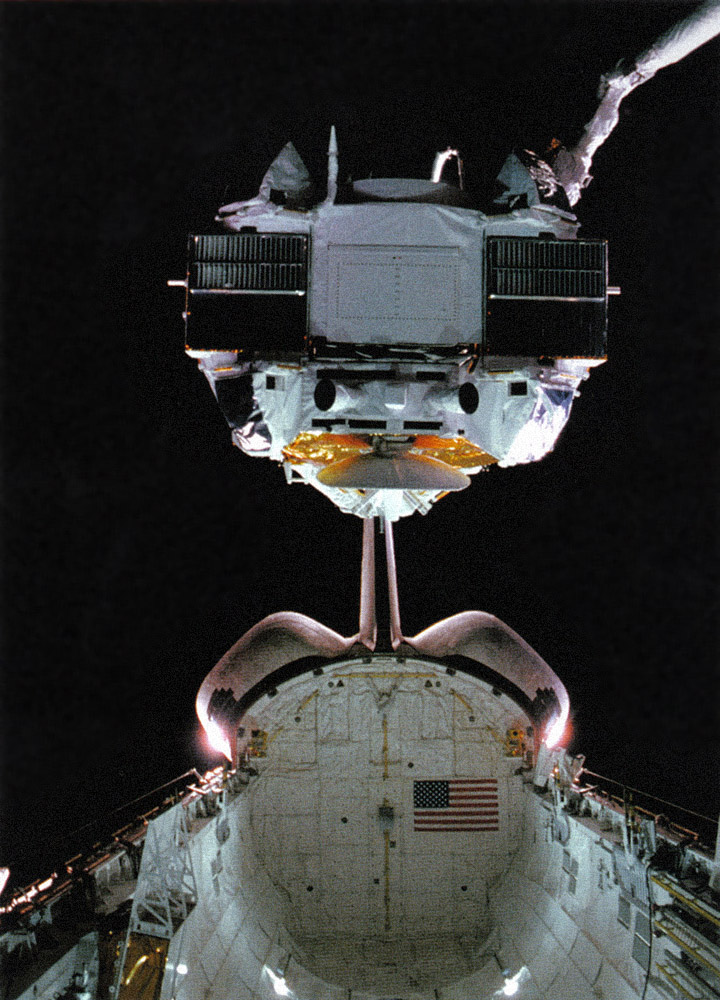
Compton Gamma Ray Observatory being deployed from Space Shuttle Atlantis in 1991 in Earth orbit

It was deployed to an altitude of 450 km on April 7, 1991, when it was first launched. Over time the orbit decayed and needed re-boosting to prevent atmospheric entry sooner than desired. It was reboosted twice using onboard propellant: in October 1993 from 340 km to 450 km altitude, and in June 1997 from 440 km to 515 km altitude, to potentially extend operation to 2007.

== De-orbit ==
After one of its three gyroscopes failed in December 1999, the observatory was deliberately de-orbited. At the time, the observatory was still operational; however the failure of another gyroscope would have made de-orbiting much more difficult and dangerous. With some controversy, NASA decided in the interest of public safety that a controlled crash into an ocean was preferable to letting the craft come down on its own at random. It entered the Earth's atmosphere on 4 June 2000, with the debris that did not burn up ("six 1,800-pound aluminum I-beams and parts made of titanium, including more than 5,000 bolts") falling into the Pacific Ocean.

This de-orbit was NASA's first intentional controlled de-orbit of a satellite.

== See also ==
- Gamma-ray astronomy
- NASA – Great Observatories program
- List of heaviest spacecraft
