= Terafab =

Planned semiconductor fabrication plant

TeraFab AI, LLC
- Logo
- Industry: Semiconductor industry
- Products: Artificial intelligence hardware
- Owners: Tesla; SpaceX
- Website: Official website

Terafab is a planned semiconductor fabrication plant being developed by Tesla and SpaceX, with participation from Intel. The venture was announced by Elon Musk on March 21, 2026, and centers on the construction of a vertically integrated large-scale facility with a long-term goal of producing one terawatt (one trillion watts) of artificial intelligence (AI) compute hardware per year. It is meant to bring lithography, chip fabrication and advanced packaging together under one roof.

Initial prototype fab operations are to be focused in Austin, Texas, in proximity to Tesla's existing Gigafactory Texas, with a permanent plant planned for Grimes County, Texas, on the site of a former electric generating plant. County filings in May 2026 estimated capital investment of US$55 billion for the initial phases and as much as $119 billion if all phases of the Grimes County facility are built. In August 2026 the Texas governor's office said the project would involve a capital investment of more than $16.8 billion and create 3,000 jobs.

== Background and development ==
=== Announcement ===
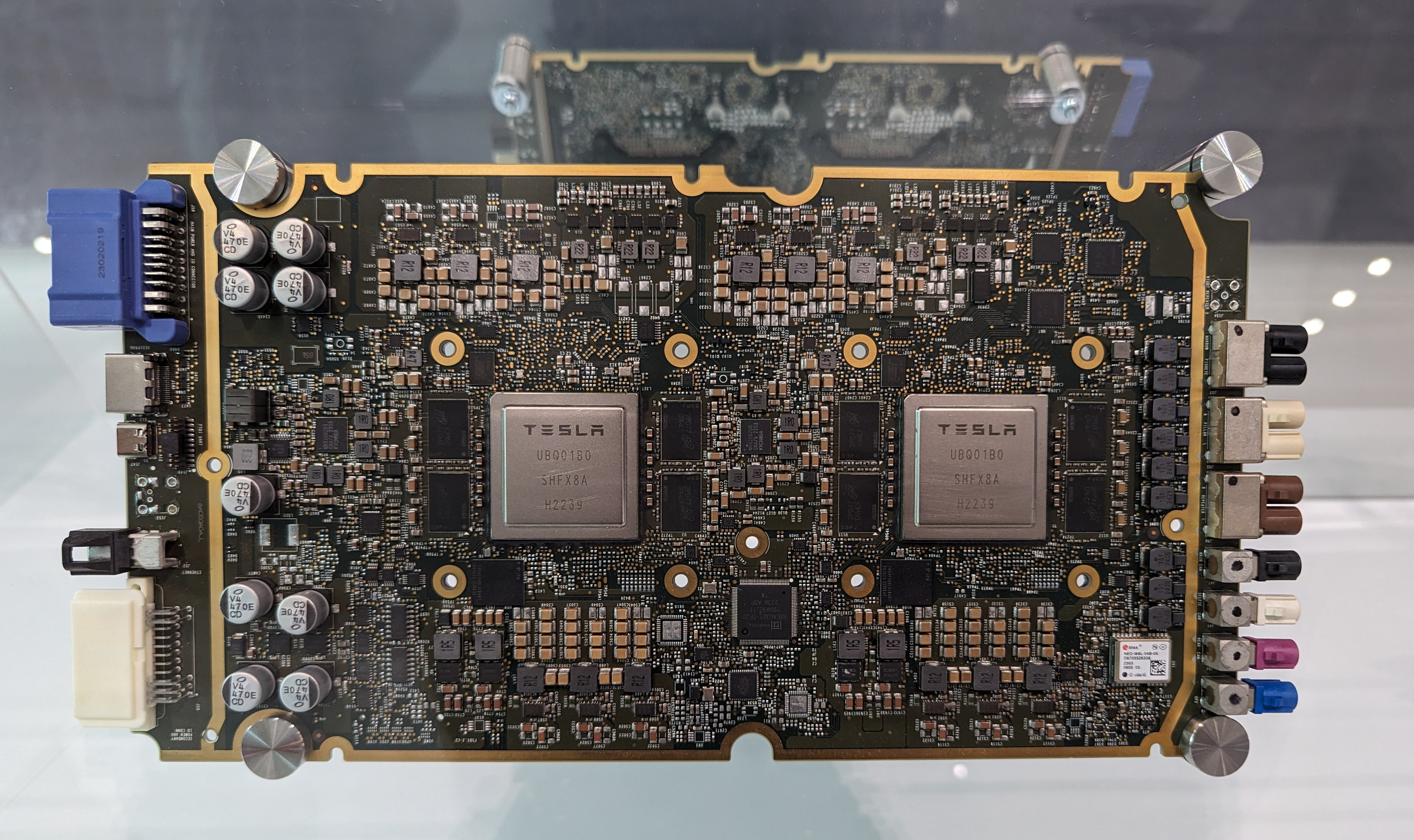
Terafab is intended to produce edge-inference chips for Tesla vehicles (see Tesla Autopilot) and Optimus robots.

Musk had talked about building a "Terafab" for several months before the launch. At Tesla's November 2025 shareholder meeting he said it would initially produce 100,000 wafers a month and could eventually grow to 1 million, and on Tesla's January 2026 earnings call he said "I think Tesla needs to build a Terafab". The project was officially launched on March 21, 2026, at an event at the defunct Seaholm Power Plant in Austin, Texas, where Musk said "We're starting a galactic civilization". Electrek reported that Tesla was targeting 2-nanometer process technology, an initial 100,000 wafer starts per month and as many as 1 million at full capacity, and that Musk said the plant would make between 100 and 200 billion custom AI and memory chips a year. Musk also showed a concept design for a small solar-powered AI satellite with 100 kW of power capacity.

Speaking in a livestream broadcast on X, Musk said the existing chip industry could not expand quickly enough to meet his companies' projected demand, both for "edge inference" chips for Tesla vehicles and Optimus humanoid robots and for higher-power chips hardened for space, which he said would run hotter than chips used on Earth to cut radiator mass on satellites. He put current global AI compute output at roughly 20 gigawatts a year, about 2% of what his companies would eventually need: "We either build the Terafab, or we don't have the chips, and we need the chips, so we build the Terafab." He projected 100 to 200 gigawatts a year of chips for use on Earth and on the order of a terawatt for AI satellites in space. Tom's Hardware noted that he gave no timeline and did not repeat his earlier 2 nm target during the broadcast.

=== Intel participation and structuring ===
On April 7, 2026, Intel announced that it would join the Terafab project with SpaceX and Tesla. As of 2026, Intel is one of only three companies in the world producing leading-edge 2 nm-class logic chips, the other two being Taiwan Semiconductor Manufacturing Company (TSMC) and Samsung Electronics. On April 22, 2026, during Tesla's first-quarter earnings call, Musk said Terafab planned to use Intel's 14A (1.4 nm-class) process, which he expected "will be probably fairly mature or ready for prime time" by the time Terafab scales up.

SpaceX's May 2026 initial public offering registration statement said Intel was expected to contribute its expertise in "designing, fabricating, and packaging ultra-high performance chips", but also that Terafab was in the "very early stages", that SpaceX and Tesla had agreed only "a general framework for the future development of Terafab" with specific projects subject to separate negotiations, that financial terms and intellectual property rights had not been finalized, and that neither Tesla nor Intel was obligated to remain part of the project. In June 2026, SpaceX unveiled the design of AI1, its first-generation orbital data center satellite; its chief financial officer said early versions would use Nvidia hardware and later ones were expected to use radiation-hardened chips from Terafab.

=== Construction ===
A Texas Jobs, Energy, Technology and Innovation (JETI) agreement between the Office of the Governor, the Anderson-Shiro school district and TeraFab AI, LLC, signed in August 2026, lists a construction period from December 1, 2026, to December 31, 2028. SpaceX plans to power the site, a former coal-fired power plant, with its own natural-gas plants and "very large battery arrays", and Electrek noted that Tesla solar was not part of the plan.

== Prototype fabrication facility ==
Tesla and SpaceX are building a research fab, referred to in some coverage as the Advanced Technology Chip Fab (ATCF), as a smaller development facility separate from the main Terafab plant; drone footage published in mid-2026 showed foundation work under way. In August 2026 Tesla said it had broken ground on the research fab, on the North Campus of Giga Texas, in April, calling it "the precursor to Terafab". Tesla's current chips are made by outside foundries; Electrek reported that Samsung's fab in Taylor, Texas, was producing Tesla's AI5 chip, with TSMC covering the rest.

Musk had said on Tesla's April 22, 2026, earnings call that Tesla had "finalized plans for the research chip fab" and would start construction that year. He said it would be a roughly $3 billion project "capable of maybe a few thousand wafers per month" and "really intended to try out ideas", combining mask making, logic, memory and packaging in one building for a fast design loop, something he said he was not aware of anywhere else. He said that, as far as had been worked out, Tesla would build the research fab and SpaceX the initial phase of the large-scale Terafab, and that any such arrangement had to be approved by both companies' boards. He also congratulated Tesla's chip team on taping out its fifth-generation AI chip, AI5.

== Grimes County facility ==
In June 2026, Grimes County commissioners designated a reinvestment zone at the Gibbons Creek Reservoir and approved a tax abatement agreement with SpaceX. It gives a 100% abatement of county property taxes on new improvements for ten years (tax years 2027–2036) in return for fixed payments in lieu of taxes of $20 million a year, and requires SpaceX to invest at least $5 billion by the end of 2030 and create at least 1,800 full-time-equivalent jobs by the end of 2035. Under a companion economic development agreement, the county will rebate its maintenance-and-operations property taxes above $20 million a year for a further 25 years, from 2037 through 2061. The reservoir was impounded in 1981 and used as a cooling pond for a power plant.

Some county residents have pushed back against the project, citing its possible effects on their rural way of life, home prices and the environment, and complaining that the approval process was rushed.

In August 2026, SpaceX and Tesla announced that Terafab would be built in Grimes County. SpaceX said the first phase would need approximately $16.8 billion in capital investment from the two companies, with later phases potentially taking the total much higher; that the plant would cover more than 100,000,000 square feet (9,300,000 square metres) and employ at least 3,000 people; and that it would use water from the Gibbons Creek Reservoir for industrial operations rather than groundwater. It said Terafab would make edge chips for Tesla's Optimus robots and Cybercabs, along with high-power chips for SpaceX's planned space-based data centers, and described it as the largest chip manufacturing facility on the planet.
