= Gibbons Creek Reservoir =

Former power plant cooling reservoir in Texas, US

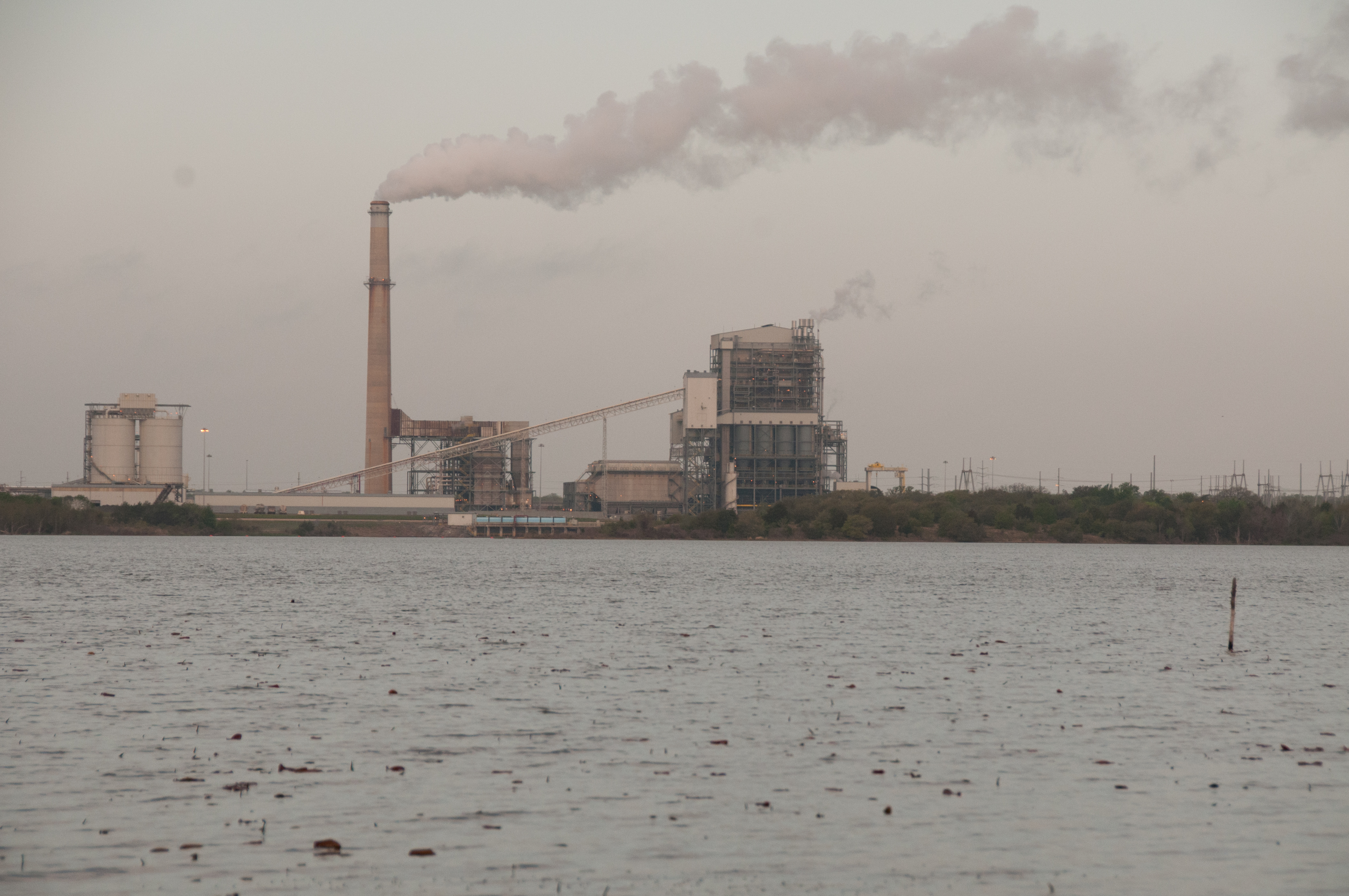
- The coal-fired power plant at Gibbons Creek Reservoir, 2013

- Location within Texas Location within the United States
- Location: Grimes County, Texas
- Coordinates: 30°37.45′N 96°3.85′W
- Type: Power plant cooling pond
- Primary inflows: Gibbons Creek
- Primary outflows: Gibbons Creek
- Basin countries: United States
- Surface area: 2,770 acres (1,120 ha)
- Max. depth: 34 ft (10 m)
- Surface elevation: 247 ft (75 m)

Gibbons Creek Reservoir (sometimes referred to as Gibbons Creek Lake) on Gibbons Creek in the Navasota River basin, 20 miles (32 km) east of College Station, Texas, United States.

Initially impounded in 1981, the reservoir was built as a power plant cooling reservoir for the Gibbons Creek Steam Electric Station, generating electricity for the municipally-owned electric utilities of the cities of Bryan, Denton, Garland, and Greenville until 2018.

Gibbons Creek Reservoir is a popular recreational destination due to its location near the Bryan–College Station metropolitan area.

In June 2026, SpaceX and Tesla, Inc. received planning approval to build the Terafab facility on land adjacent to Gibbons Creek Reservoir and plans to continue to use the reservoir for cooling as originally designed for the coal-fired power plant.

== Gibbons Creek Steam Electric Station ==
The reservoir was built as a power plant cooling reservoir for the Gibbons Creek Steam Electric Station, a 470 MW coal-fired electricity generation facility. The dam and lake were managed by Texas Municipal Power Agency (TMPA), which used the reservoir as a cooling pond for the power plant generating electricity for the cities of Bryan, Denton, Garland, and Greenville (all of whom have municipality-owned electric companies).

The coal-fired power plant adjancent to Gibbons Creek Reservoir was shutdown in 2018, and mothballed indefinitely, by TMPA in January 2019 for environmental and cost reasons, particularly due to the high cost of coal-powered electricity when compared to cheaper natural gas following 2010s regulatory changes. Since 2016, TMPA has been trying to sell the plant.

== Recreational uses ==
Boating and fishing are very popular. Recreational fishing and other activities on the lake are regulated by the Texas Parks and Wildlife Department.

The steam power plant on the southwest shore of the lake formerly pumped in warm water year-round that kept this lake a viable fishing spot year-round in the 1980s into the 2010s, even when other lakes in the area became too cold in the winter months.

=== Fishing ===
Gibbons Creek Reservoir has been stocked with species of fish intended to improve the utility of the reservoir for recreational fishing. Fish present in Gibbons Creek Reservoir include largemouth bass, bluegill, catfish, Tilapia, white crappie, and black crappie. The water has standing timber and aquatic vegetation but generally is rather turbid. Its shoreline is covered with native grasses mixed with oak, elm, and other East Texas hardwoods.
