= Heat sink (disambiguation) =

The term heat sink may refer to:

- Heat sink, a component used to conduct heat away from an object
- Thermal reservoir, an element of a thermodynamic system which can absorb arbitrary amounts of energy without changing temperature
  - Thermal energy storage, the storage of energy in a thermal reservoir for later reuse
