= Singulus Technologies =

German manufacturer of coating and process equipment

Singulus Technologies AG
- Type: Aktiengesellschaft
- Traded as: FWB: SNG (General Standard)
- Industry: Manufacturing, photovoltaics, semiconductor equipment
- Founded: 1995; 31 years ago
- Headquarters: Kahl am Main, Germany
- Key people: Markus Ehret; Lars Lieberwirth (members of the Executive Board)
- Products: Production equipment for photovoltaics, semiconductors, medical technology and decorative coatings
- Website: www.singulus.com

Singulus Technologies AG is a German engineering company based in Kahl am Main. It develops and sells equipment for vacuum coating, surface treatment, wet processing and thermal processing, used in photovoltaics, semiconductors, medical technology and decorative coatings. The business is organized into Solar, Semiconductor and Life Science segments. After its optical-disc equipment business had declined to spare parts and service work, Singulus sold the remaining activities to Sonopress in December 2025.

== History ==
The company was established in 1995 in a buyout at the merger of Balzers and Leybold, and went public in 1997.

Dr.-Ing. Stefan Rinck retired as chief executive on 31 December 2024 after more than 15 years in the post. Since 1 January 2025 the company has been jointly led by Markus Ehret and Lars Lieberwirth as equal members of the executive board.

In 2025 Singulus reported revenue of €48.3 million and an operating loss (EBIT) of €11.7 million, after delays in orders in the Solar and Semiconductor segments. Deutsche Börse classifies the shares in the General Standard of the Frankfurt Stock Exchange.

On 10 November 2026 the company signed a contract with SpaceX to supply a turnkey production line for heterojunction solar cells, with delivery planned for the first half of 2027. Singulus said the contract was part of a strategic partnership begun in March 2026, under which it planned to deliver further lines for SpaceX's Starmind satellite manufacturing in Bastrop, Texas.

For the first nine months of 2026, revenue rose to €60.4 million and EBIT was €1.2 million. After the reporting date the company took out a subordinated secured loan of about €22.75 million to repay liabilities to Triumph Science and Technology Group of China, which had held 16.75% of the shares. Triumph agreed to sell that stake to A1681X GmbH & Co. KG, whose principal shareholder is Roland Lacher, a co-founder of Singulus. The supervisory board and Markus Ehret agreed that Ehret would leave the executive board on 31 December 2026.
