= Edge inference =

Execution of machine learning models on edge devices

Edge inference is the process of running machine learning or deep learning models on local devices (edge devices) such as smartphones, IoT devices, embedded systems, and edge servers instead of centralized cloud computing infrastructure. A key feature of edge computing is edge inference, which allows for real-time data processing, low latency, and improved privacy by reducing the amount of data sent to remote servers.

== See also ==
- Edge computing
- TinyML
- Embedded system
- Artificial intelligence
- Fog computing
