= TinyML =

Machine learning on low-power embedded devices

TinyML (short for tiny machine learning) is an area of machine learning that focuses on deploying and running models on low-power, resource-constrained embedded systems such as microcontrollers and edge devices.

TinyML supports on-device inference with low latency and minimal reliance on cloud connectivity, which makes it suitable for applications in the Internet of Things (IoT), wearable devices, and real-time systems.

== History ==
The idea of running machine learning models on embedded systems has gained traction in the late 2010s, as model compression, quantization, and efficient neural network architectures progressed.

The term TinyML was popularized in 2019 with the publication of the book TinyML by Pete Warden and Daniel Situnayake and the creation of the TinyML Foundation.

== See also ==
- Edge computing
- Artificial intelligence
