= Starmind (satellite) =

Planned AI satellite constellation

Starmind is a planned constellation of solar-powered space-based AI data center satellites in development by SpaceX as of 2026. The first satellite design is called AI1. The satellite will be inserted into a sun-synchronous orbit in order to remain constantly in the sunlight. The satellite aims to overcome building, energy and cooling restraints on Earth. SpaceX has filed for 1 million Starmind satellites at the FCC.

== Properties ==
The first-generation Starmind satellite, AI1, is to have a wingspan of 75 m (246 ft) and a deployed height of 30 m (98 ft). SpaceX says it will have a 210 kW solar array and a 160 m^{2} deployable liquid radiator to shed heat into space. Its computing equipment is rated at up to 250 kW at peak and 175 kW on average. In June 2026, Elon Musk said the design assumed a solar array output of 250 W/m^{2}.

In August 2026, Nvidia announced the internal compute of the satellite would be based on an optimized Nvidia Vera Rubin (NVL72) system. Each satellite will be equipped with 72 Nvidia Rubin GPUs, 36 Nvidia Vera CPUs, an NVLink interconnect system, and a BlueField 4 data processing unit, with up to 250 kW peak and 175 kW average compute payload.

== Development ==
In October 2026, SpaceX CEO Elon Musk wrote on X that the Starmind computer being co-engineered by SpaceX and Nvidia was "far better than almost anyone expects" and would "reach volume production next year". He also praised then Nvidia CEO Jensen Huang ("Jensen rocks") and called working with Nvidia's engineers "pure joy".

SpaceX says it is building a factory nicknamed the Gigasat Factory in Bastrop, Texas, and that it expects to produce thousands of AI satellites there starting as soon as late 2027. In July 2026, Bastrop County said it had not received a development permit application for the project, although construction activity was visible at the site.

The satellites are to be launched into orbit on SpaceX's Starship rocket. SpaceX currently launches Starship from Starbase in Texas. It is also planning a larger spaceport, Starbase Louisiana, with its first Starship launch targeted for 2029, which Reuters described as a critical base for the company's AI satellite launch ambitions.

In November 2026, SpaceX announced a major supply contract with German Singulus Technologies for the development of heterojunction solar cells (HJT) and the equipment needed to manufacture them. Singulus is to supply over 100 GW of equipment per year for Starmind, with a first production line to be delivered to Bastrop, Texas in the first half of 2027, and production to scale substantially subsequently. The first production line reportedly cost more than $ 69 million. Elon Musk commented the deal on X, saying "This is for Starmind to create a sentient sun."
