= Thermal reservoir =

Thermodynamic system whose temperature does not change regardless of heat transfer

A thermal reservoir, also thermal energy reservoir or thermal bath, is a thermodynamic system with a heat capacity so large that the temperature of the reservoir changes relatively little when a significant amount of heat is added or extracted. As a conceptual simplification, it effectively functions as an infinite pool of thermal energy at a given, constant temperature. Since it can act as an inertial source and sink of heat, it is often also referred to as a heat reservoir or heat bath.

Lakes, oceans and rivers often serve as thermal reservoirs in geophysical processes, such as the weather. In atmospheric science, large air masses in the atmosphere often function as thermal reservoirs.

== Heat transfer physics ==
Since the temperature of a thermal reservoir T does not change during the heat transfer, the change of entropy in the reservoir is:
$$dS_\text{Res}=\frac{\delta Q}{T}$$
where $\delta Q$ is the incremental reversible transfer of heat energy into the reservoir.

The microcanonical partition sum $Z(E)$ of a heat bath of temperature T has the property:
$$Z(E+\Delta E) = Z(E) e^{\Delta E/k_\text{B} T}$$
where $k_\text{B}$ is the Boltzmann constant. It thus changes by the same factor when a given amount of energy is added. The exponential factor in this expression can be identified with the reciprocal of the Boltzmann factor.

== Applications ==
- geothermal heat pump
- thermal heat sink for electrical generation power plant; for example, Gibbons Creek Steam Electric Station

== See also ==
- Heat
- Heat sink
- Heated bath
- Gibbs sampler (heat bath algorithm)
- Thermal energy storage
