= SpaceX =

American aerospace and AI conglomerate

Space Exploration Technologies Corp.

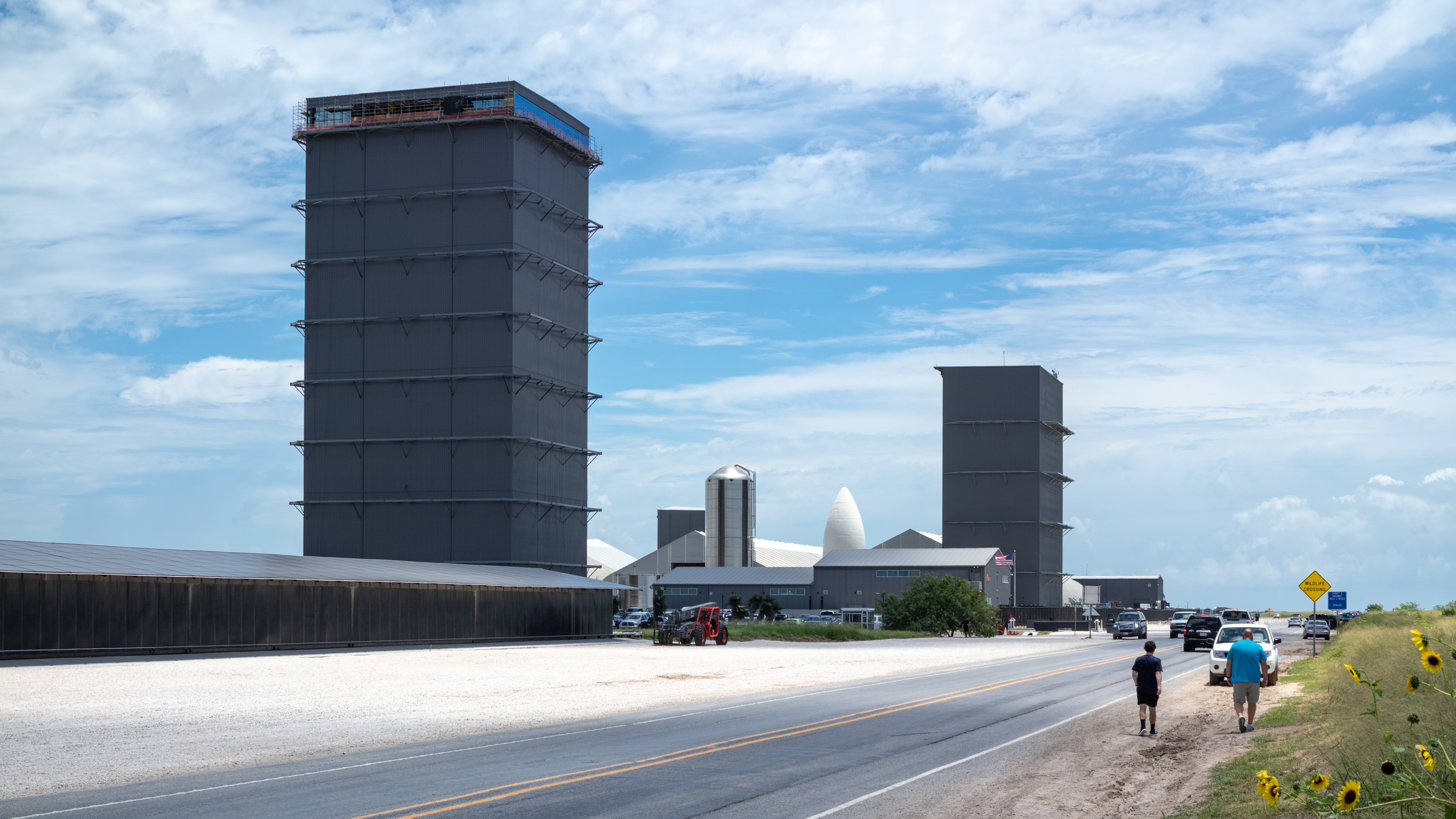
- Company headquarters, SpaceX Starbase in Starbase, Texas
- Trade name: SpaceX
- Type: Public
- Traded as: Nasdaq: SPCX (Class A); Nasdaq-100 component
- Industry: Space; Telecommunications; Artificial intelligence
- Founded: March 14, 2002 (24 years ago) in El Segundo, California, U.S.
- Founder: Elon Musk
- Headquarters: SpaceX Starbase, Starbase, Texas, U.S.
- Key people: Elon Musk (CEO, chairman & CTO); Gwynne Shotwell (president & COO); Bret Johnsen (CFO)
- Products: Launch vehicles; Dragon capsules; Starshield; Starmind
- Revenue: ▲US$18.7 billion (2025)
- Operating income: ▲US$−2.6 billion (2025)
- Net income: ▲US$−4.9 billion (2025)
- Total assets: ▲US$92.1 billion (2025)
- Total equity: ▼US$2.6 billion (2025)
- Owners: Elon Musk (48.4% of Class A, as converted; about 82% voting power); Alphabet Inc. (7.2% of Class A)
- Number of employees: 22,621 (2026)
- Subsidiaries: SpaceX Super Intelligence; Starlink; Terafab
- Website: spacex.com
- Footnotes; Financials as of December 31, 2025. References

Space Exploration Technologies Corp., doing business as SpaceX, is an American conglomerate which is a aerospace manufacturer and provider of space transportation, telecommunications, and artificial intelligence (AI) services, headquartered at the Starbase development site in Starbase, Texas. The company operates three primary segments: Space, which develops and flies the Falcon 9, Falcon Heavy, and Starship launch vehicles, as well as the Dragon spacecraft, and conducts more orbital launches annually than any other launch provider (including national programs); Connectivity, which operates the Starlink satellite constellation and satellite-based high-speed broadband internet service; and AI, conducted through its wholly owned subsidiary SpaceX Super Intelligence, which develops the Grok family of large language models (LLMs) and related products, operates the social network X (formerly Twitter), and builds and runs large-scale data centers.

The company is credited with advances in rocket propulsion, reusable launch vehicles, human spaceflight, and satellite constellation technology. The company's largest customers include NASA, the National Reconnaissance Office, Axiom Space, SES, Eutelsat, and OneWeb. In 2026, SpaceX also began selling computing capacity at its Colossus data centers to Anthropic, Google, and Reflection AI. According to a Schedule 13G filed in August 2026, Elon Musk beneficially owns 48.4% of SpaceX's Class A common stock on an as-converted basis, including options and restricted shares. Through his Class B super-voting stock, he held about 82% of the voting power after the IPO, or 84.4% counting shares underlying his options. SpaceX was founded in 2002 by Elon Musk with the goal of reducing spaceflight costs, improving the reliability of access to outer space for ordinary humans, and colonizing Mars. In 2008, after three failed attempts between 2006 and 2008 that almost pushed the company to bankruptcy, SpaceX successfully launched the Falcon 1 into orbit, becoming the first private company to develop and launch a liquid-fueled rocket to orbit. In 2010, the company launched the Falcon 9 launch vehicle and the Dragon 1 spacecraft to fulfill NASA's Commercial Orbital Transportation Services (COTS) contracts for cargo deliveries to the International Space Station (ISS). In 2012, SpaceX began flying Commercial Resupply Services missions to the ISS, becoming the first private company to successfully dock with the station, and started developing technologies to make the Falcon 9 first stage reusable. In 2015, Falcon 9 flight 20 was the first successful landing of an orbital-class rocket's first stage and the company's SES-10 completed the first reflight of an orbital-class booster in 2017. After a decade of development, Falcon Heavy, which consists of three Falcon 9-derived boosters, made its maiden flight in 2018. As of May 2026, Falcon 9 launches averaged approximately three missions per week, and SpaceX had completed approximately 650 orbital launches, more than 540 of them on flight-proven Falcon rockets.

In 2019, the first operational satellite of the Starlink internet satellite constellation came online, diversifying the revenue of the company. Starlink has generated the bulk of SpaceX's income and led to its Starshield military counterpart. In 2020, SpaceX began to operate its Dragon 2 capsules for NASA and private entity crewed missions. Around this time, SpaceX began building test prototypes for Starship, the largest launch vehicle in history, which first reached orbit in September 2026. SpaceX plans to adapt it as a human lander for lunar missions under NASA's Artemis program. In 2026, SpaceX acquired Musk's artificial intelligence company xAI (subsequently operated as the wholly owned subsidiary SpaceX Super Intelligence), and announced a joint venture with Tesla, Inc. to build Terafab, a large plant for semiconductor device fabrication. The initial public offering (IPO) of SpaceX on June 12, 2026, which raised $85.7 billion, became the largest IPO in history and made Musk the first US-dollar trillionaire due to his ownership stake of nearly half the company. In October 2026, the company reported its first profitable quarter since the IPO, with net income of $4.4 billion on revenue of $14.6 billion.

== History ==
=== 2001–2002: Founding ===
In early 2001, Elon Musk met Robert Zubrin and donated $100,000 to his Mars Society and briefly joined its board of directors. In August 2001, he gave a plenary talk at their fourth convention where he announced Mars Oasis, a project to land a greenhouse and grow plants on Mars.

Musk initially attempted to acquire a Dnepr launch vehicle for the project through Russian contacts provided by Jim Cantrell; however, he was unsuccessful.

Musk returned with his team to Moscow, this time bringing Michael D. Griffin, who later became the 11th Administrator of NASA, but found the Russians increasingly unreceptive. On the flight home, Musk stated that he could start a company to build the affordable rockets the project required. By applying vertical integration, using inexpensive commercial off-the-shelf components when possible, and adopting the modular approach of modern software engineering, Musk believed SpaceX could significantly cut launch costs.

In early 2002, Elon Musk started to look for staff for his company, soon to be named SpaceX. Musk approached five people for the initial positions, including Griffin, who declined the position of Chief Engineer, Jim Cantrell and John Garvey (Cantrell and Garvey later founded the company Vector Launch), rocket engineer Tom Mueller, and Chris Thompson. SpaceX was first headquartered in a warehouse in El Segundo, California. Early SpaceX employees, such as Tom Mueller (CTO), Gwynne Shotwell (COO), and Chris Thompson (VP of Operations), were previously employed at TRW and Boeing. Musk personally interviewed and approved all of SpaceX's early employees.

=== 2003–2010: Falcon 1, COTS, and Falcon 9 ===
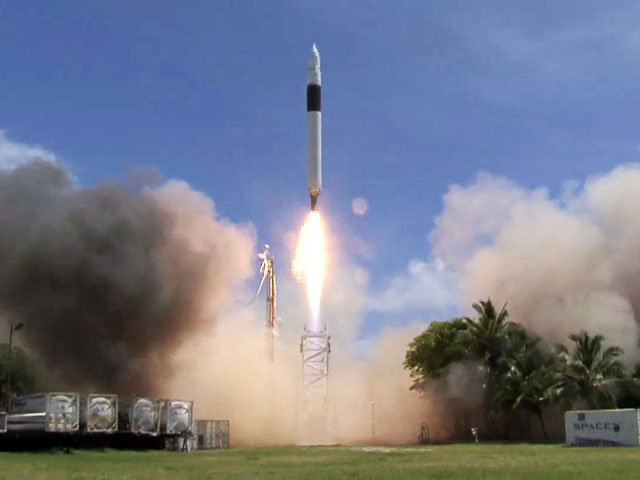
The first successful Falcon 1 launch in September 2008

SpaceX developed its first orbital launch vehicle, the Falcon 1, with internal funding. The Falcon 1 was an expendable two-stage-to-orbit small-lift launch vehicle. The total development cost of Falcon 1 was approximately $90 million to $100 million. The Falcon rocket series was named after Star Wars's Millennium Falcon fictional spacecraft.

In 2004, SpaceX protested against NASA to the Government Accountability Office (GAO) because of a sole-source contract awarded to Kistler Aerospace. Before the GAO could respond, NASA withdrew the contract, and formed the Commercial Orbital Transportation Services (COTS) program. In 2005, SpaceX announced plans to pursue a human-rated commercial space program through the end of the decade, a program that would later become the Dragon spacecraft.

SpaceX originally intended to follow its light Falcon 1 launch vehicle with an intermediate capacity vehicle, the Falcon 5. The company instead decided in 2005 to proceed with the development of the Falcon 9, a medium-lift launch vehicle intended to be reusable. Development of the Falcon 9 was accelerated by NASA, which committed to purchasing several commercial flights if specific capabilities were demonstrated. In 2006, the company was selected by NASA and awarded $396 million to provide crew and cargo resupply demonstration contracts to the International Space Station (ISS) under the COTS program. The contract provided development funding for the Dragon spacecraft, Falcon 9, and demonstration launches of Falcon 9 with Dragon.

The first two Falcon 1 launches were purchased by the United States Department of Defense under the DARPA Falcon Project which evaluated new U.S. launch vehicles suitable for use in hypersonic missile delivery for Prompt Global Strike. The first three launches of the rocket, between 2006 and 2008, all resulted in failures, which almost ended the company. Financing for Tesla Motors had failed, as well, and consequently Tesla, SolarCity, and Musk personally were all nearly bankrupt at the same time. Musk was reportedly "waking from nightmares, screaming and in physical pain" because of the stress.

The financial situation started to turn around with the first successful launch achieved on the fourth attempt on September 28, 2008. Musk split his remaining $30 million between SpaceX and Tesla, and NASA awarded SpaceX a $1.6 billion Commercial Resupply Services (CRS) contract in December, thus financially saving the company. Based on these factors and the further business operations they enabled, the Falcon 1 was soon retired following its second successful, and fifth total, launch in July 2009. This allowed SpaceX to focus company resources on the development of a larger orbital rocket, the Falcon 9. Gwynne Shotwell was also promoted to company president at the time, for her role in successfully negotiating the CRS contract with the NASA Associate Administrator Bill Gerstenmaier.

As part of the COTS contract, the Falcon 9 launched for the first time in June 2010 with the Dragon Spacecraft Qualification Unit, using a mockup of the Dragon spacecraft.

The first operational Dragon spacecraft was launched in December 2010 aboard COTS Demo Flight 1, the Falcon 9's second flight, and safely returned to Earth after two orbits, completing all its mission objectives. By December 2010, the SpaceX production line was manufacturing one Falcon 9 and Dragon every three months.

=== 2011–2018: Falcon 9, Dragon, and NASA contracts ===
Video of the first launch of Falcon 9

In April 2011, as part of its second-round Commercial Crew Development (CCDev) program, NASA issued a $75 million contract for SpaceX to develop an integrated launch escape system for Dragon in preparation for human-rating it as a crew transport vehicle to the ISS. NASA awarded SpaceX a fixed-price Space Act Agreement (SAA) to produce a detailed design of the crew transportation system in August 2012.

In early 2012, approximately two-thirds of SpaceX stock was owned by Musk and his seventy million shares were then estimated to be worth $875 million on private markets, valuing SpaceX at $1.3 billion. In May 2012, with the Dragon C2+ launch, Dragon became the first commercial spacecraft to deliver cargo to the International Space Station. After the flight, the company private equity valuation nearly doubled to $2.4 billion or $20/share. By that time, SpaceX had operated on total funding of approximately $1 billion over its first decade of operation. Of this, private equity provided approximately $200 million, with Musk investing approximately $100 million and other investors having put in about $100 million.

SpaceX's active reusability test program began in late 2012 with testing low-altitude, low-speed aspects of the landing technology. The Falcon 9 prototypes performed vertical takeoffs and landings (VTOL). High-velocity, high-altitude tests of the booster atmospheric return technology began in late 2013.

==== Commercial launches and rapid growth ====
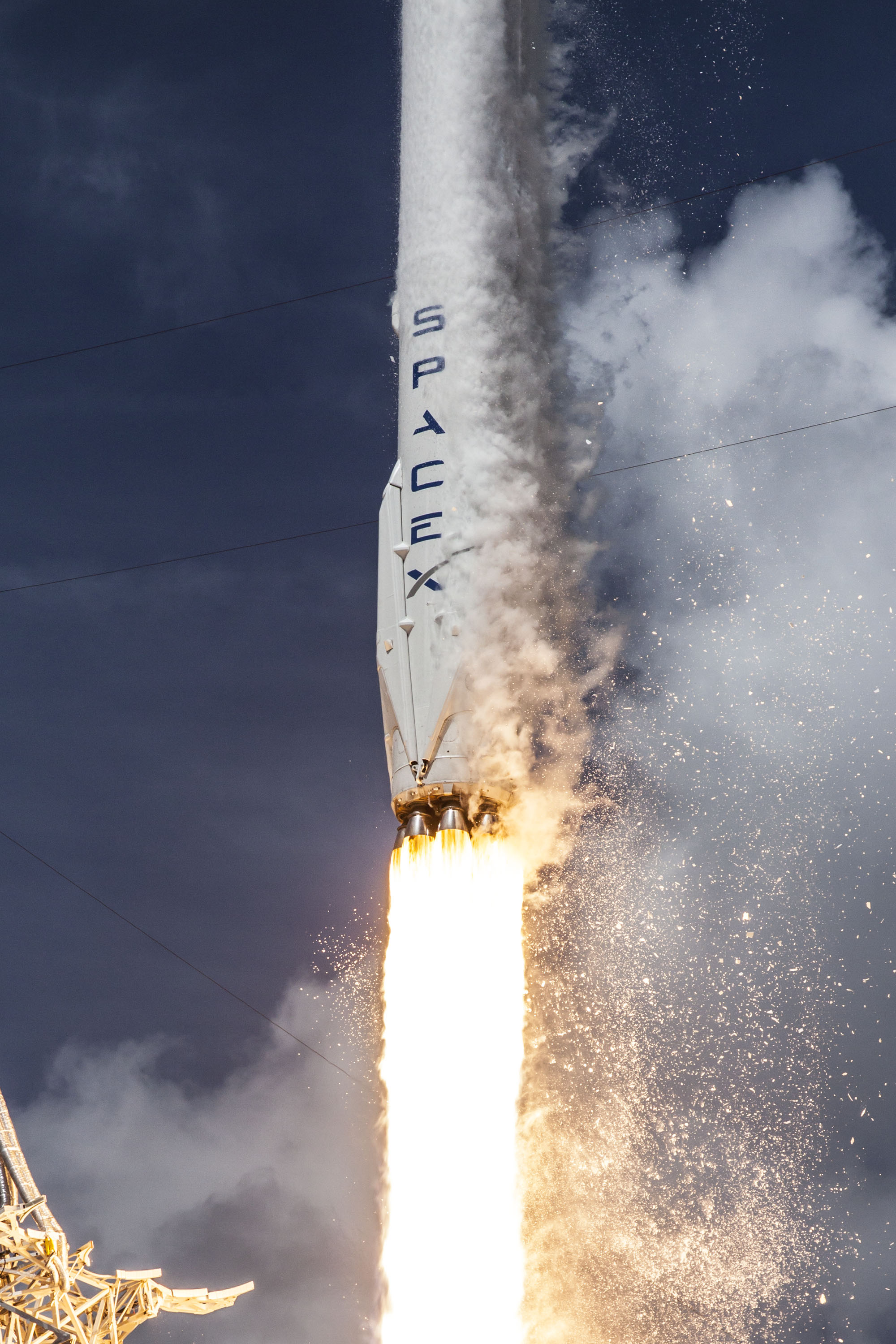
Launch of Falcon 9 carrying ORBCOMM OG2-M1, July 2014

SpaceX launched the first commercial mission for a private customer in 2013. In 2014, SpaceX won nine contracts out of the 20 that were openly competed worldwide. That year Arianespace requested that European governments provide additional subsidies to face the competition from SpaceX. Beginning in 2014, SpaceX capabilities and pricing also began to affect the market for launch of U.S. military payloads, which for nearly a decade had been dominated by the large U.S. launch provider United Launch Alliance (ULA). The monopoly had allowed launch costs by the U.S. provider to rise to over $400 million over the years. In September 2014, NASA's Director of Commercial Spaceflight, Kevin Crigler, awarded SpaceX the Commercial Crew Transportation Capability (CCtCap) contract to finalize the development of the Crew Transportation System. The contract included several technical and certification milestones, an uncrewed flight test, a crewed flight test, and six operational missions after certification.

In January 2015, SpaceX raised $1 billion in funding from Google and Fidelity Investments, in exchange for 8.33% of the company, establishing the company valuation at approximately $12 billion. The same month SpaceX announced the development of a new satellite constellation, called Starlink, to provide global broadband internet service with 4,000 satellites.

The Falcon 9 had its first major failure in late June 2015, when the seventh ISS resupply mission, CRS-7 exploded two minutes into the flight. The problem was traced to a failed two-foot-long steel strut that held a helium pressure vessel, which broke free due to the force of acceleration. This caused a breach and allowed high-pressure helium to escape into the low-pressure propellant tank, causing the failure.

==== Reusability milestones ====
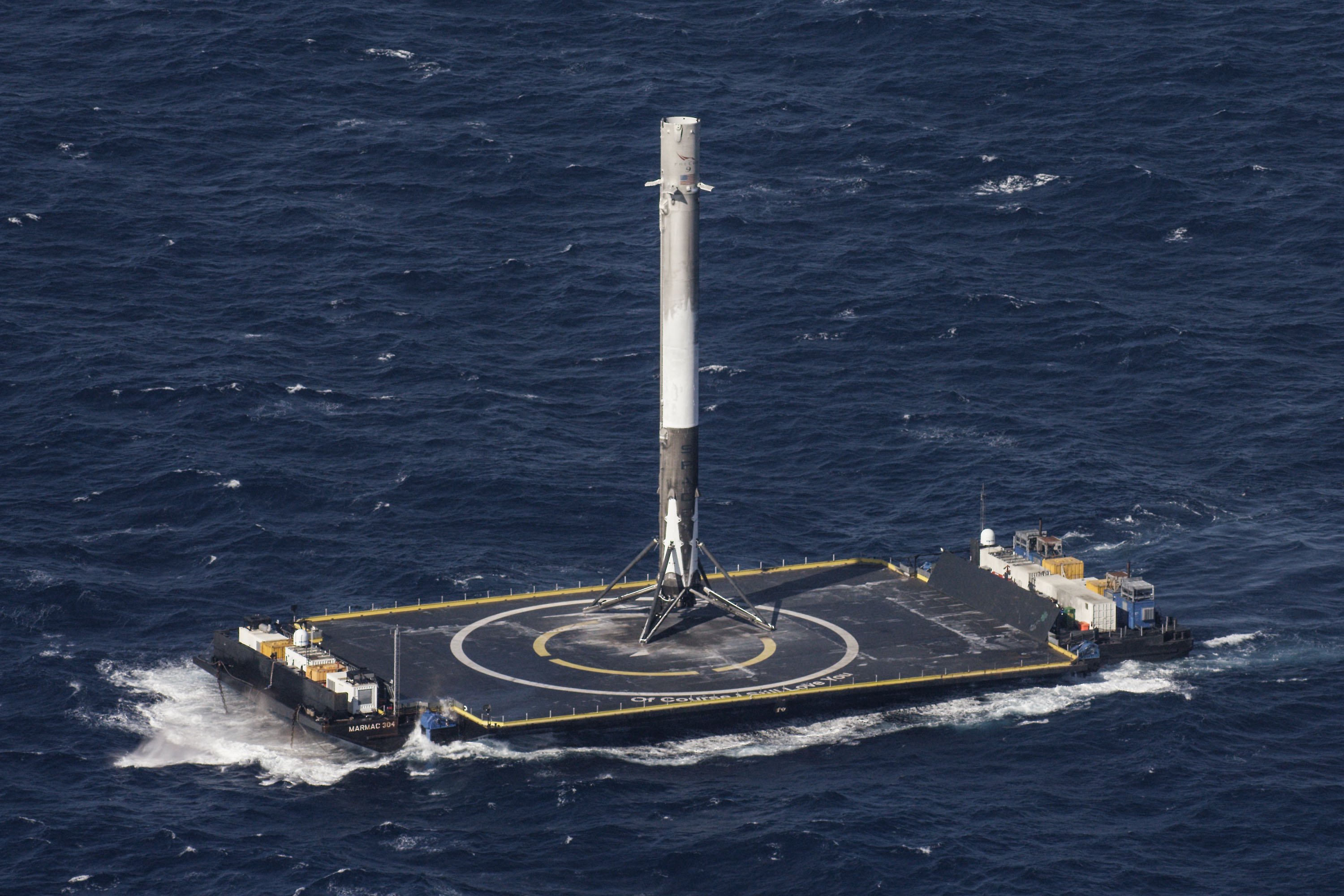
Falcon 9 first stage on an autonomous spaceport drone ship (ASDS) barge after the first successful landing at sea, SpaceX CRS-8 mission

SpaceX first achieved a successful landing and recovery of a first stage in December 2015 with Falcon 9 Flight 20. In April 2016, the company achieved the first successful landing on the autonomous spaceport drone ship (ASDS) Of Course I Still Love You in the Atlantic Ocean. By October 2016, following the successful landings, SpaceX indicated they were offering their customers a 10% price discount if they choose to fly their payload on a reused Falcon 9 first stage.

A second major rocket failure happened in early September 2016, when a Falcon 9 exploded during a propellant fill operation for a standard pre-launch static fire test. The payload, the AMOS-6 communications satellite valued at $200 million, was destroyed. The explosion was caused by the liquid oxygen that is used as propellant turning so cold that it solidified and ignited with carbon composite helium vessels. Though not considered an unsuccessful flight, the rocket explosion sent the company into a four-month launch hiatus while it worked out what went wrong. SpaceX returned to flight in January 2017.

In March 2017, SpaceX launched a returned Falcon 9 for the SES-10 satellite. This was the first time a re-launch of a payload-carrying orbital rocket went back to space. The first stage was recovered again, also making it the first landing of a reused orbital class rocket.

==== Leading global commercial launch provider ====
In 2017, SpaceX formed a subsidiary, The Boring Company, and began work to construct a short test tunnel on land adjacent to the SpaceX headquarters and manufacturing facility, using a small number of SpaceX employees, which was completed in May 2018, and opened to the public in December 2018. During 2018, The Boring Company was spun out into a separate corporate entity with 6% of the equity going to SpaceX, less than 10% to early employees, and the remainder of the equity to Elon Musk.

In July 2017, the company raised $350 million at a valuation of $21 billion. In 2017, SpaceX achieved a 45% global market share for awarded commercial launch contracts.

By March 2018, SpaceX had more than 100 launches on its manifest representing about $12 billion in contract revenue. The contracts included both commercial and government (NASA/DOD) customers. This made SpaceX the leading global commercial launch provider measured by manifested launches.

=== 2019–2020: Raising capital, Starlink launch, and crewed launches ===
In January 2019, SpaceX announced it would lay off 10% of its workforce to help finance the Starlink and Starship projects. The purpose of the Starship vehicle is to enable large-scale transit of humans and cargo to the Moon, Mars, and beyond. SpaceX's Starship is the largest and most powerful rocket ever flown, with a planned payload capacity of 100+ tons. Construction of initial prototypes and tests for Starship started in early 2019 in Florida and Texas. All Starship construction and testing moved to the new SpaceX South Texas launch site later that year.

In 2019 SpaceX raised $1.33 billion across three funding rounds. By May 2019, the valuation of SpaceX had risen to $33.3 billion and reached $36 billion by March 2020.

In May 2019, SpaceX launched the first large batch of 60 Starlink satellites, beginning to deploy what would become the world's largest commercial satellite constellation the following year. On August 19, 2020, after a $1.9 billion raise, one of the largest by any private company, valuation increased to $46 billion.

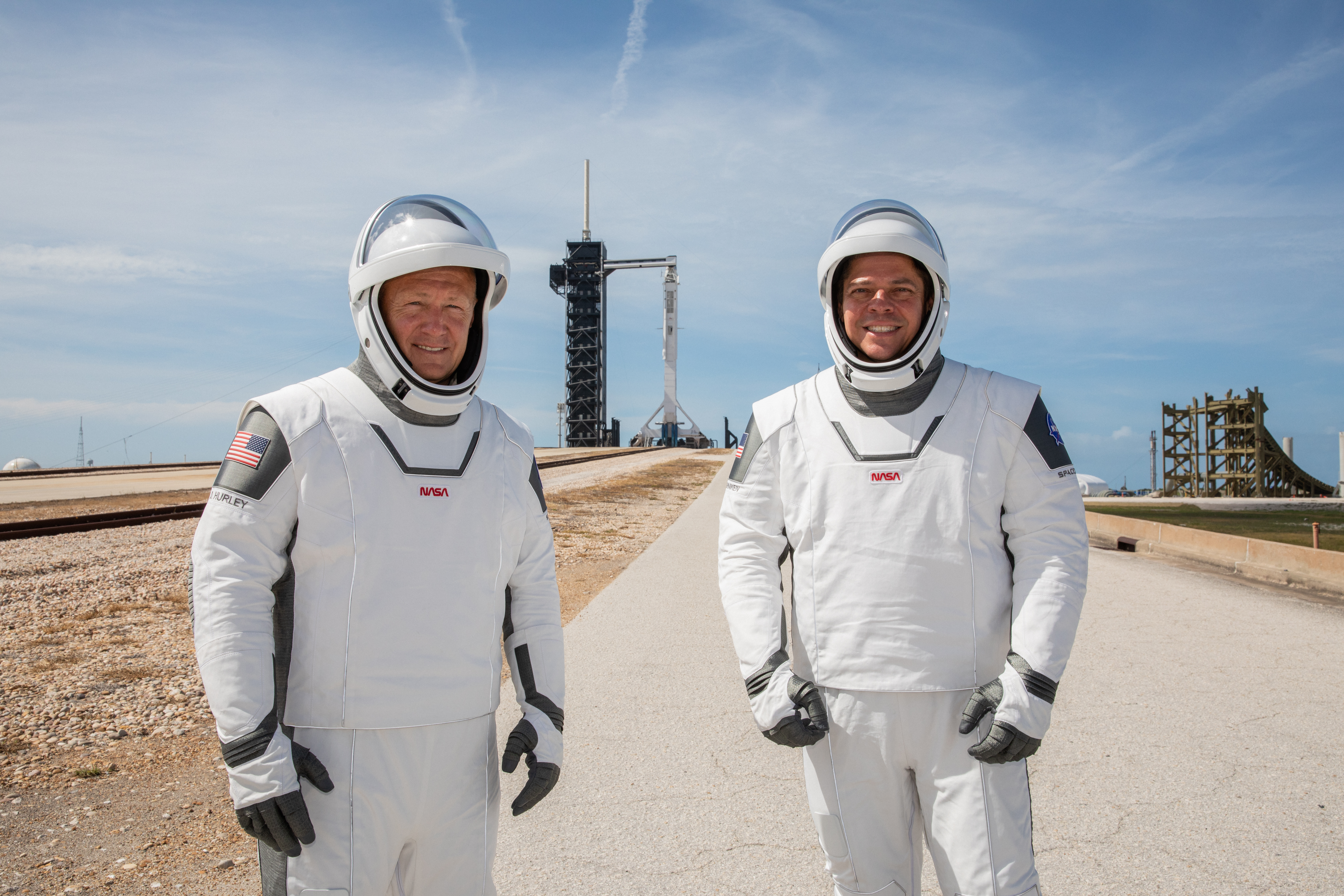
NASA astronauts Douglas Hurley (left) and Robert Behnken (right) wearing custom-fit spacesuits designed by SpaceX

In May 2020, SpaceX successfully launched two NASA astronauts (Doug Hurley and Bob Behnken) into orbit on a Crew Dragon spacecraft during Crew Dragon Demo-2, making SpaceX the first private company to send astronauts to the International Space Station and marking the first crewed orbital launch from American soil in 9 years. The mission launched from Kennedy Space Center Launch Complex 39A (LC-39A) in Florida.

=== 2021–present ===
In February 2021, SpaceX raised an additional $1.61 billion from 99 investors at a per share value of approximately $420, lifting the valuation to ~$74 billion. By 2021, SpaceX had raised more than $6 billion. Most of the capital raised since 2019 was used to support the Starlink satellite constellation and the development and manufacture of Starship. By October 2021, the valuation grew to $100.3 billion.

On April 16, 2021, Starship HLS won a NASA contract for the Artemis program. In 2021, SpaceX entered into agreements with Google Cloud Platform and Microsoft Azure to provide on-ground computer and networking services for Starlink. A funding round in 2022 valued SpaceX at $127 billion.

In July 2021, SpaceX unveiled another drone ship named A Shortfall of Gravitas, first landing CRS-23 on August 29, 2021. Within the first 130 days of 2022, SpaceX launched 18 rockets and returned two crews. On December 13, 2021, Musk announced that the company was starting a carbon dioxide removal program that would convert captured carbon into rocket fuel, after he announced a $100 million donation to the X Prize Foundation the previous February to fund a contest to develop the best carbon capture technology.

In 2022, most SpaceX launches focused on Starlink, a consumer internet business that sends batches of internet-beaming satellites and now has over 6,000 satellites in orbit. SpaceX launched a rocket approximately every six days in 2022, with 61 launches in total, the most launches ever of a single vehicle type in a single year. All but one (a Falcon Heavy in November) was a Falcon 9. In August 2022, the European Space Agency (ESA) began discussions with SpaceX to substitute for Russian launches, amid the Russian invasion of Ukraine.

In November 2023, SpaceX announced it would acquire its parachute supplier Pioneer Aerospace out of bankruptcy for $2.2 million.

In 2024, SpaceX moved its headquarters from Hawthorne, California, to SpaceX Starbase in Brownsville, Texas, a move Musk attributed to California legislation. The Hawthorne facility continues to support the company's Falcon launch business.

SpaceX's 2024 Polaris Dawn mission featured the first-ever private spacewalk.

By July 2025, as part of a $5 billion equity raise, SpaceX agreed to invest $2 billion in xAI.

In October 2026, SpaceX agreed to acquire a nationwide portfolio of low-band 800 MHz spectrum licenses from investment firm Grain Management, subject to Federal Communications Commission approval. The spectrum, which covers nearly the entire U.S. population, is intended to support a terrestrial component of Starlink Mobile that can penetrate buildings, complementing the company’s existing satellite-based 2 GHz spectrum. Elon Musk described the acquisition as providing the remaining piece needed for “complete phone coverage in America.”

On October 1, 2026, SpaceX launched Crew-13, its thirteenth operational crew rotation mission to the ISS for NASA. By early November 2026, the Falcon 9 had flown 119 times during the year, with more than 70 percent of those launches carrying Starlink satellites.

==== Starlink expansion ====
On July 16, 2021, SpaceX entered an agreement to acquire Swarm Technologies, a private company building a low Earth orbit satellite constellation for communications with Internet of things (IoT) devices, for $524 million.

In December 2022, the U.S. Federal Communications Commission (FCC) approved the launch of up to 7,500 of SpaceX's next-generation satellites in its Starlink internet network.

In September 2025, SpaceX said it would purchase the rights to use some of EchoStar's spectrum for $17 billion in a cash and stock deal. The company said it would use the spectrum as a foundation for Starlink's direct-to-cell business around the globe.

By the end of September 2026, Starlink had 13.6 million consumer subscribers, 1.6 million more than three months earlier, and its Starlink Mobile direct-to-cell service had more than 22 million monthly users. The company reported coverage in 174 countries and about 11,100 satellites, including some approved for deorbit. The first third-generation (V3) Starlink satellites were launched on Starship in 2026.

==== Starlink in the Russo-Ukrainian war ====
In February 2022, SpaceX activated their Starlink satellite internet service in Ukraine, to replace internet and communication networks degraded or destroyed during the war. Starlink provides critical service to Ukrainian civilians, government and military. It has aided humanitarian relief as well as defense and counterattacks on Russian positions.

Initially, SpaceX provided and funded Starlink services to Ukraine without charge. As of June 2023 Starlink expenses for Ukraine were covered by the US Department of Defense. As of December 2023, Poland was the largest contributor of terminals. SpaceX did not extend Starlink availability to Russian-occupied areas such as Crimea.

In 2022, Elon Musk denied a Ukrainian request to extend Starlink's coverage up to Russian-occupied Crimea during a counterattack on a Crimean port; providing service would have violated US sanctions. Media reports erroneously characterized it as Musk "turning off" Starlink coverage in Crimea. In late 2022, SpaceX announced Starshield, a program designed for government customers. In October 2026, Starlink restricted Ukrainian access during ten days by imposing a speed limit of 160 km/h, disrupting several combat missions and preventing its use to intercept jet-powered Russian drones, in an attempt to get Ukraine to stop long-range strikes on Russia's oil industry. In November 2026, a speed limit was again applied to Ukrainian access to Starshield amidst peace talks.

The use of Starlink to attack Russian targets was criticized by Russian officials. Russia's military repeatedly tried to disrupt Starlink services. Reportedly, the Russian military at one point obtained Starlink terminals through other countries. This unauthorized Starlink use was eventually blocked. In February 2026, Starlink eliminated service to all terminals in Ukraine not on a whitelist, in order to prevent Russia's fraudulent Starlink use. This significantly disrupted Russian military communications, which had come to rely on Starlink.

==== Starship ====
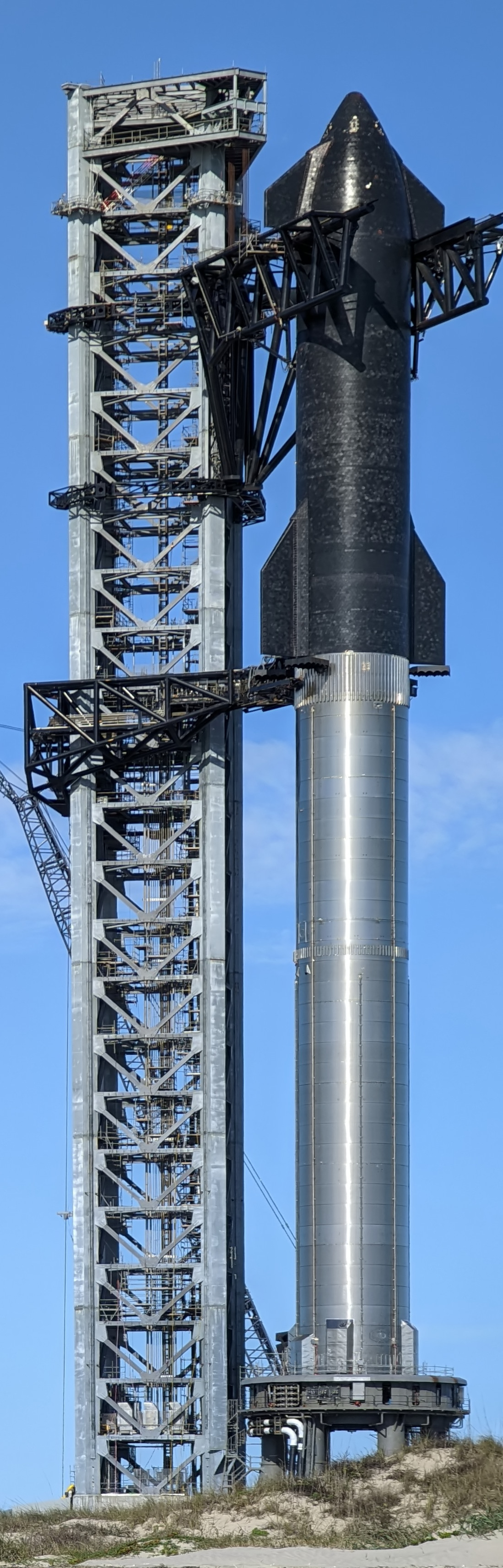
Starship in launch position

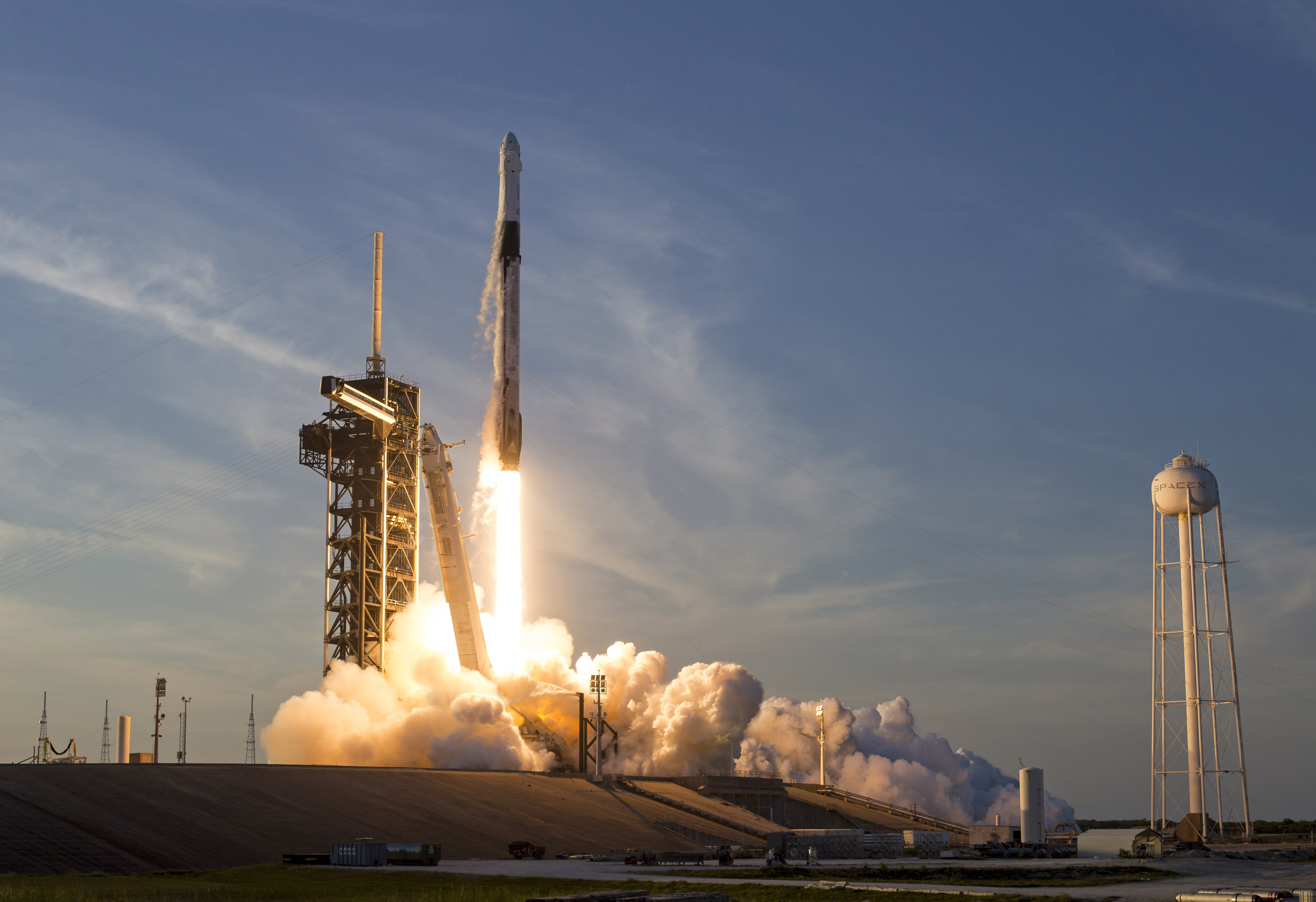
Dragon's Flight: SpaceX Crew-10 launches aboard a SpaceX Falcon 9 rocket carrying the Dragon spacecraft piloted by astronaut and Air Force Maj. Nichole "Vapor" Ayer at Kennedy Space Center, FL, March 14, 2025.

On April 20, 2023, Starship lifted off on its first orbital flight test. Multiple booster engines failed during the ascent, and the vehicle lost control before stage separation; the automated flight termination system destroyed it over the Gulf of Mexico about four minutes after liftoff. Musk had said beforehand that clearing the launch pad would count as a success, and Musk, SpaceX, and other individuals familiar with the space industry referred to the test flight as one.

Musk said at the time that it would take "six to eight weeks" to get the infrastructure prepared for another launch. In October 2023, a senior SpaceX executive stated the company had been ready to launch the next test flight since September. He accused government regulators of disrupting the project's progress, adding the delay could lead to China beating U.S. astronauts back to the Moon.

On November 18, 2023, SpaceX launched Starship on its second flight test. All 33 booster engines ran for the full ascent and the vehicle completed its first hot-staging separation; the booster broke apart shortly afterward, and the ship reached space before it was destroyed near the end of its burn.

In early March 2024 SpaceX announced that it was targeting March 14 as the tentative launch date for its next uncrewed Starship launch configuration flight test, pending the issuance of a "launch license" by the FAA. This license was granted on March 13, 2024. On March 14, 2024, at 13:25 UTC, Starship launched for the third time and for the first time Starship reached its planned suborbital trajectory. The flight ended with the booster experiencing a malfunction shortly before landing and the ship being lost during re-entry over the Indian Ocean.

On June 4, 2024, SpaceX received the launch license for Starship's fourth flight test. The licensure itself was notable in that it was the first time that the FAA included a clause that would allow SpaceX to launch subsequent test flights without a mishap investigation, provided that they met a similar launch profile and used the same specification of hardware. The provision could prove to speed the development timeline. The flight took place on June 6, 2024, and was the first on which both stages completed controlled splashdowns: the booster in the Gulf of Mexico and the ship, after surviving atmospheric re-entry, in the Indian Ocean.

On October 12, 2024, SpaceX received FAA approval for Starship's fifth flight test. The flight, launched the following day, was the first without engine failures, and the Super Heavy booster returned to the launch site and was caught by the launch tower's mechanical arms on the first attempt.

SpaceX launched Starship on its sixth flight test on November 19, 2024. The booster diverted from its catch attempt to a splashdown in the Gulf of Mexico, while the ship relit a Raptor engine in space for the first time and completed a controlled splashdown in the Indian Ocean.

On January 16, 2025, SpaceX launched Starship on its seventh flight test, the first flight of a Block 2 ship, Ship 33, which carried Starlink simulators as a demonstration payload. The launch tower caught the Super Heavy booster, B14, for the second time. Contact with the ship was lost about eight and a half minutes after launch, and it broke apart over the Atlantic Ocean near the Turks and Caicos Islands. The FAA required a mishap investigation of the failure.

On March 6, 2025, SpaceX launched Starship on its eighth flight test. The launch tower caught the Super Heavy booster for the third time, but contact with the ship was lost minutes into the flight after several of its engines shut down, and it broke apart, with debris seen across Florida's skies. According to a preliminary investigation, the seventh flight had been disrupted by an oxygen leak and sustained fires in the ship's aft section, which caused its engines to shut down and triggered the self-destruct system.

The ninth flight test, on May 27, 2025, was the first to reuse a Super Heavy booster. The ship reached its planned velocity, but a propellant leak led to a loss of attitude control and it re-entered the atmosphere uncontrolled over the Indian Ocean.

On June 18, 2025, a Starship upper stage exploded during preparations for a static fire test at Starbase, in what the company described as a "major anomaly"; SpaceX said that all personnel were safe. Local officials afterward raised concerns about regulatory oversight of the site and about emergency response, and a crane collapse during the cleanup led the Occupational Safety and Health Administration to fine SpaceX approximately $116,000.

On August 26, 2025, the tenth flight test met its main objectives: the ship deployed eight Starlink simulators, the first payload deployment from Starship, relit an engine in space, and completed a controlled splashdown in the Indian Ocean. The eleventh flight test, on October 13, 2025, repeated these results on the final flight of the Block 2 vehicle.

On May 22, 2026, SpaceX successfully launched the twelfth flight test of Starship. This was the first flight of the V3 vehicle, incorporating Raptor 3 engines. It carried a payload of approximately 44,000 kg (97,000 lb) of Starlink mass simulators. During launch, one of the 33 Raptor 3 engines on the Super Heavy first stage shut down early, and one of the 6 Starship upper-stage engines shut down prematurely, but despite the engine-out, the vehicle achieved its planned suborbital trajectory. The booster suffered a subsequent anomaly and was destroyed before splashdown over the Gulf of Mexico, while the ship completed its suborbital flight and made a targeted soft splashdown in the Indian Ocean near Australia.

On July 24, 2026, the thirteenth flight test deployed 20 Starlink V3 satellites on a suborbital trajectory, and the ship completed its flight through a splashdown in the Indian Ocean. The booster was lost when several engines failed to relight for its landing burn.

On September 28, 2026, SpaceX conducted the fourteenth integrated flight test of Starship from Starbase, Texas. The mission marked the first time a Starship vehicle achieved sustained Earth orbit and the first operational deployment of Starlink V3 satellites. Ship 41 deployed 26 Starlink V3 satellites after an orbital insertion burn. One engine shut down early during ascent, and mission controllers shortened the planned multi-orbit flight, bringing the ship down earlier than scheduled near Hawaii. The Super Heavy booster completed its flight profile and splashed down in the Gulf of Mexico.

On of November 14, 2026, the fifteenth flight was completed. It was launched from Starbase with Booster 22 and Ship 42. The ship, which bears the name Don't Panic in reference to Douglas Adams's The Hitchhiker's Guide to the Galaxy, deployed a second batch of 26 Starlink V3 satellites and remained in orbit for about 22 hours. SpaceX planned to catch both stages with the launch tower, however, only the upper stage ("ship") was able to be caught using the mechanical arms on the launch tower at Starbase. This flight test made history at SpaceX as the first instance of a catch of the Starship upper stage.

==== xAI acquisition, Terafab, and Starfall ====
On February 2, 2026, SpaceX announced that it had acquired xAI, an artificial intelligence company also founded by Musk, in an all-stock transaction that structured xAI as a wholly owned subsidiary of SpaceX. The acquisition combines SpaceX's rocket and satellite capabilities with xAI's artificial intelligence technology. SpaceX stated that the goal is to develop space-based AI data centers to overcome the power and cooling limitations of terrestrial facilities. The plan includes deploying large numbers of satellites to provide AI compute capacity and exploring long-term operations on the Moon and Mars. The acquisition valued SpaceX at $1T and xAI at $250B, for a combined total of $1.25T.

In March, SpaceX announced the project to build Terafab, a joint project with Tesla (joined by Intel in April 2026), to build a large semiconductor fabrication project centering on the construction of a vertically integrated "mega-fab" designed to produce more than one terawatt (one trillion watts) of artificial intelligence compute capacity per year, encompassing advanced logic chips, memory modules, and packaging technologies. They will initially build a much smaller fast-iteration semiconductor fab, with all functions under one roof, at the existing Giga Texas property near Austin, Texas. The following month, The New York Times reported that SpaceX had struck a deal giving it the option to acquire Cursor, an AI-assisted software development startup, for $60 billion. The acquisition closed on August 14, 2026.

In May 2026, Anthropic signed a contract of $1.25 billion per month with xAI, a subsidiary of SpaceX, for compute capacity at its Colossus data centers in the Memphis area through May 2029. According to a June securities filing, Google and SpaceX agreed on a computational rent agreement. Google will pay $920 million a month to SpaceX for the use of Nvidia chips from October 2026 until June 2029.

On May 15, the company received FAA approval for its Starfall orbit-to-Earth delivery capsule.

==== Initial public offering ====
In December 2025, reports emerged that SpaceX planned to go public, after Musk had previously rejected the idea. In January 2026, four banks were selected to lead the IPO. The shareholding structure effectively prevents anyone but Musk from firing him from his role as chief executive and board chair.

On May 20, 2026, SpaceX filed for an initial public offering (IPO) on Nasdaq under the ticker symbol SPCX. On June 11, 2026, SpaceX priced its IPO at $135 per share, giving the company a valuation of $1.77 trillion, making it the highest-valued IPO ever. The offering raised $75 billion, making it the largest IPO by proceeds on record. It began trading on the Nasdaq on June 12 under the ticker symbol SPCX. The underwriters exercised their overallotment option in full, bringing total proceeds to $85.7 billion.

SpaceX's first earnings report as a public company, in August 2026, showed second-quarter revenue of $7.8 billion and a net loss of $541 million. For the third quarter, reported on October 20, revenue rose 161 percent from a year earlier to $14.6 billion, and the company recorded net income of $4.4 billion, compared with a net loss of $1.05 billion a year earlier. The Super Intelligence segment was the largest by revenue, at $7.56 billion, followed by Connectivity at $5.25 billion and Space at $1.77 billion; Connectivity accounted for most of the operating profit. On the earnings call, Musk said that a merger with Tesla would be a "good idea" and that the boards of both companies had formed special committees to discuss one. On November 12, 2026, Bloomberg News reported that the talks had progressed and that a deal could be announced as early as December.

==== Starmind ====
SpaceX is in the development phase for a solar-powered space-based data center named Starmind. Starmind is self-described by the company as an "orbital satellite with localized compute that takes advantage of readily available power and cooling in space and beams back data via high-bandwidth lasers to the Starlink constellation." The first-generation Starmind AI1 satellite is to have a wingspan of 75 m (246 ft 1 in) and a deployed height of 30 m (98 ft 5 in), with up to 250 kW peak and 175 kW average compute payload. In August 2026, Nvidia announced the internal compute of the satellite would be based on an optimized Nvidia Vera Rubin (NVL72) system.

== Business activities ==
SpaceX's space business includes commercial launches, government missions, and the development of Starship.

Starlink provides satellite internet services across consumer, enterprise, aviation, maritime, and government markets, while Starshield is a satellite unit designed for government national-security programs.

SpaceX's artificial intelligence business includes Grok, the social network X, and the Colossus data centers, through which it provides computing capacity to outside customers including Anthropic, Google, and Reflection AI.

== Hardware ==
=== Launch vehicles ===
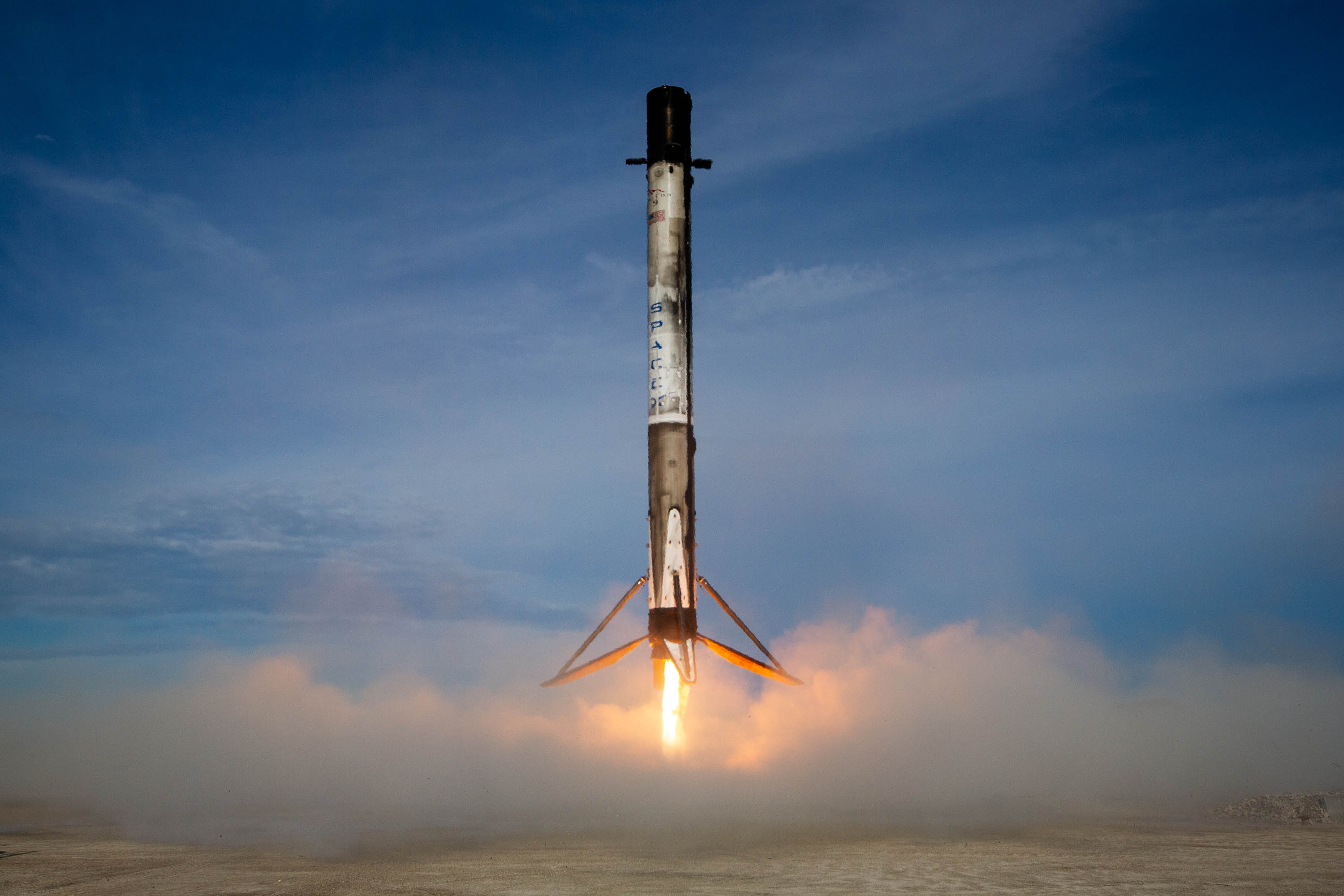
The landing of a Falcon 9 Block 5 first stage at Cape Canaveral in July 2019. VTVL technologies are used in many of SpaceX's launch vehicles.

SpaceX has developed three launch vehicles. The small-lift Falcon 1 was the first launch vehicle developed and was retired in 2009. The medium-lift Falcon 9 and the heavy-lift Falcon Heavy are both operational.

Falcon 1 was a small rocket capable of placing several hundred kilograms into low Earth orbit. It launched five times between 2006 and 2009, of which two were successful. The Falcon 1 was the first privately funded, liquid-fueled rocket to reach orbit.

Falcon 9 is a medium-lift launch vehicle capable of delivering up to 22,800 kilograms (50,265 lb) to orbit, competing with the Delta IV and the Atlas V rockets, as well as other launch providers around the world. It has nine Merlin engines in its first stage. The Falcon 9 v1.0 rocket successfully reached orbit on its first attempt on June 4, 2010. Its third flight, COTS Demo Flight 2, launched on May 22, 2012, and launched the first commercial spacecraft to reach and dock with the International Space Station (ISS). The vehicle was upgraded to Falcon 9 v1.1 in 2013, Falcon 9 Full Thrust in 2015, and finally to Falcon 9 Block 5 in 2018. The first stage of Falcon 9 is designed to retro propulsively land, be recovered, and flown again.

Falcon Heavy is a heavy-lift launch vehicle capable of delivering up to 63,800 kg (140,700 lb) to Low Earth orbit (LEO) or 26,700 kg (58,900 lb) to geosynchronous transfer orbit (GTO). It uses three slightly modified Falcon 9 first-stage cores with a total of 27 Merlin 1D engines. The Falcon Heavy successfully flew its inaugural mission on February 6, 2018, launching Musk's personal Tesla Roadster into heliocentric orbit.

Both the Falcon 9 and Falcon Heavy are certified to conduct launches for the National Security Space Launch (NSSL). As of November 21, 2026, the Falcon 9 and Falcon Heavy have been launched 717 times, resulting in 714 full mission successes, one partial success, and one in-flight failure. In addition, a Falcon 9 experienced a pre-flight failure before a static fire test in 2016.

SpaceX is developing a fully reusable super-heavy lift launch system known as Starship. It comprises a reusable first stage, called Super Heavy, and the reusable Starship second stage space vehicle. In 2017, the system was intended to supersede the company's existing launch vehicle hardware by the early 2020s. Starship made its first integrated flight in 2023, and its Super Heavy booster was first caught by the launch tower in October 2024. The vehicle reached orbit for the first time in September 2026, deploying 26 Starlink satellites.

=== Rocket engines ===
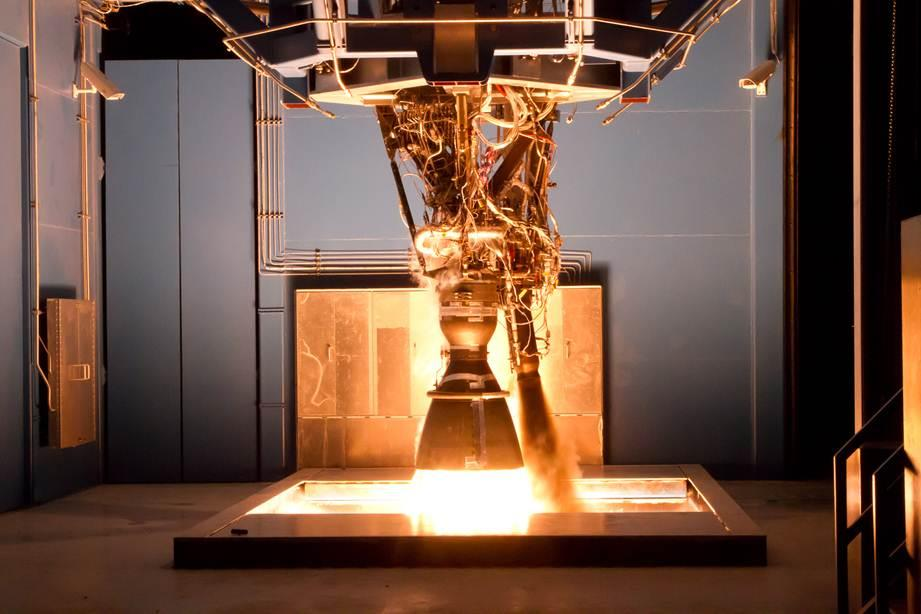
Merlin 1D engine undergoes a test at SpaceX's Rocket Development and Test Facility in McGregor, Texas.

Since the founding of SpaceX in 2002, the company has developed several rocket engines – Merlin, Kestrel, and Raptor – for use in launch vehicles, Draco for the reaction control system of the Dragon series of spacecraft, and SuperDraco for abort capability in Crew Dragon.

Merlin is a family of rocket engines that uses liquid oxygen (LOX) and RP-1 propellants. Merlin was first used to power the Falcon 1's first stage and is now used on both stages of the Falcon 9 and Falcon Heavy vehicles. Kestrel uses the same propellants and was used as the Falcon 1 rocket's second-stage main engine.

Draco and SuperDraco are hypergolic liquid-propellant rocket engines. Draco engines are used on the reaction control system of the Dragon and Dragon 2 spacecraft. The SuperDraco engine is more powerful, and eight SuperDraco engines provide launch escape capability for crewed Dragon 2 spacecraft during an abort scenario.

Raptor is a family of liquid oxygen and liquid methane-fueled full-flow staged combustion cycle engines to power the first and second stages of the in-development Starship launch system. Development versions were test-fired in late 2016, and the engine flew for the first time in 2019, powering the Starhopper vehicle to an altitude of 20 m (66 ft).

=== Dragon spacecraft ===
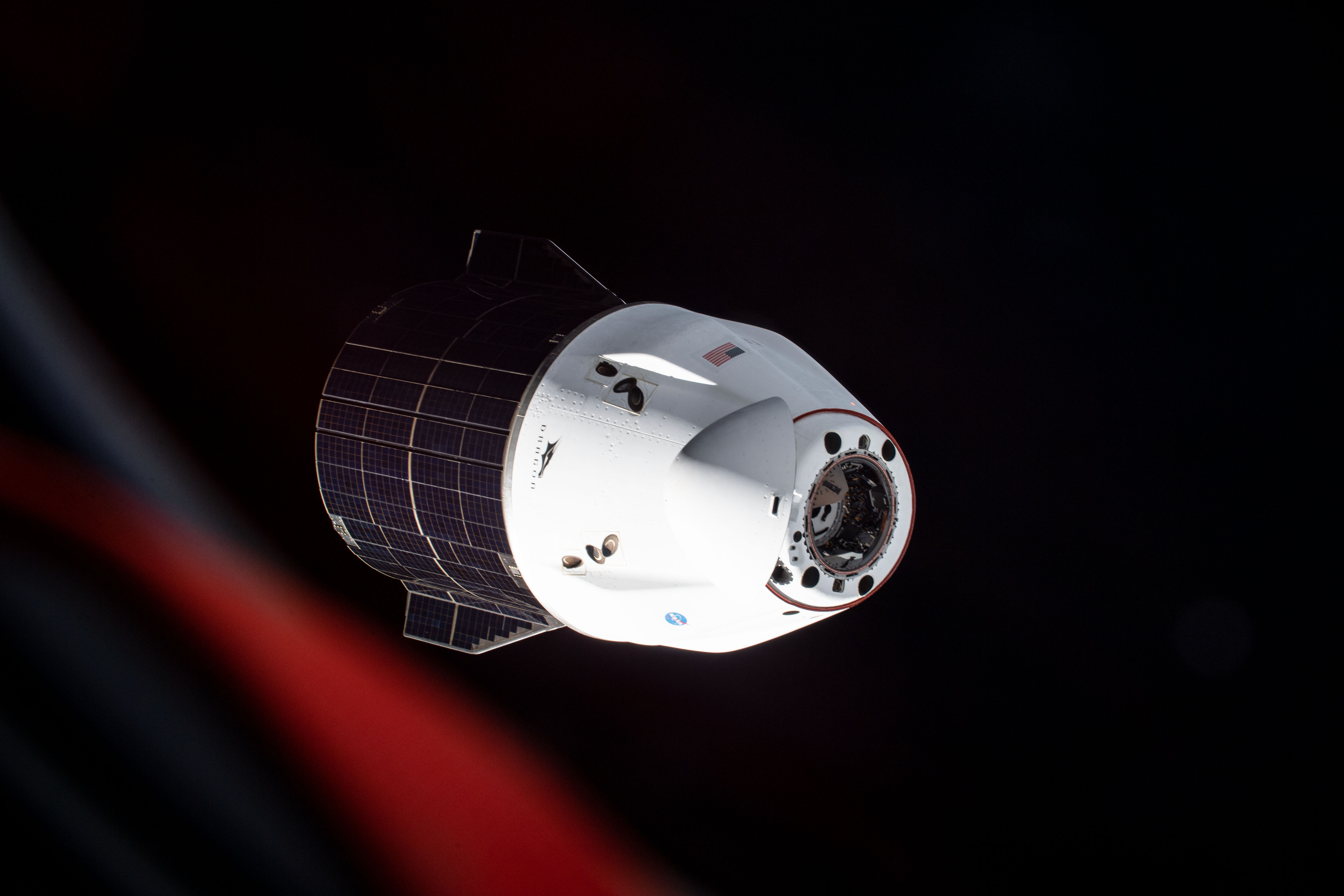
SpaceX Dragon 2 spacecraft, designed to deliver crew and cargo to and from the International Space Station (cargo version shown)

SpaceX has developed the Dragon spacecraft to transport cargo and crew to the International Space Station (ISS).

The first-generation Dragon 1 spacecraft was used only for cargo operations. It was developed with financial support from NASA under the Commercial Orbital Transportation Services (COTS) program. After a successful COTS demonstration flight in 2010, SpaceX was chosen to receive a Commercial Resupply Services (CRS) contract.

The currently operational second-generation Dragon 2 spacecraft conducted its first flight, without crew, to the ISS in early 2019, followed by a crewed flight of Dragon 2 in 2020. It was developed with financial support from NASA under the Commercial Crew Program program. The cargo variant of Dragon 2 flew for the first time in December 2020, for a resupply to the ISS as part of the CRS contract with NASA.

In March 2020 SpaceX revealed the Dragon XL, designed as a resupply spacecraft for NASA's planned Lunar Gateway space station under a Gateway Logistics Services (GLS) contract. Dragon XL is planned to launch on the Falcon Heavy, and is able to transport over 5,000 kg (11,000 lb) to the Gateway. Dragon XL will be docked at the Gateway for six to twelve months at a time.

SpaceX designed a spacesuit to be worn inside the Dragon spacecraft to protect from possible depressurization. In May 2024, SpaceX unveiled a second spacesuit designed for extravehicular activity, planned to be used for a spacewalk during the Polaris Dawn mission.

=== Autonomous spaceport drone ships ===
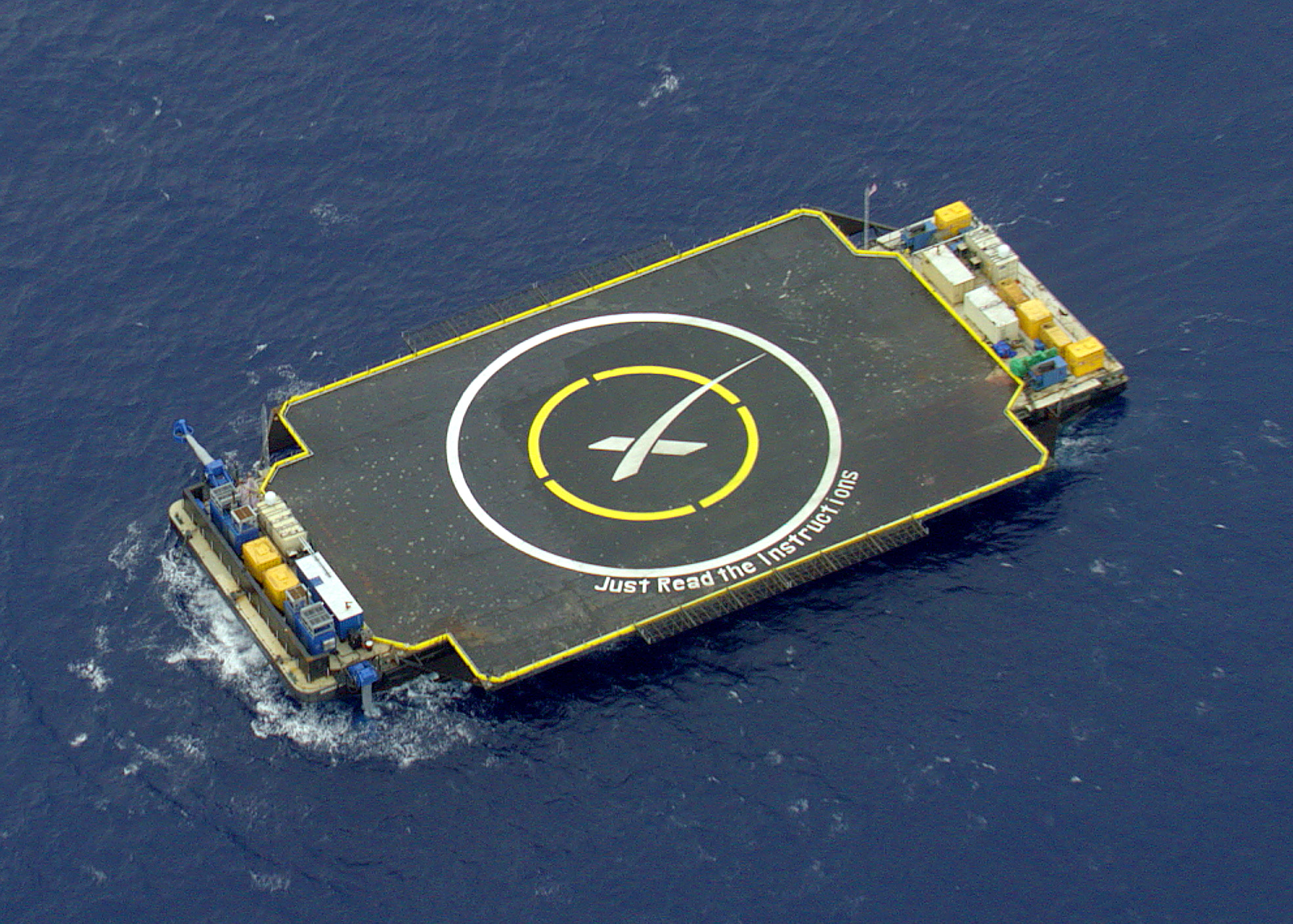
Autonomous spaceport drone ship in position prior to CRS-6 mission

SpaceX routinely returns the first stage of Falcon 9 and Falcon Heavy rockets after orbital launches. The rocket lands at a predetermined landing site using only its propulsion systems. When propellant margins do not permit a return to a launch site (RTLS), rockets return to a floating landing platform in the ocean, called autonomous spaceport drone ships (ASDS).

SpaceX also had plans to introduce floating launch platforms, which would be modified oil rigs to provide a sea launch option for their Starship launch vehicle. As of February 2023, SpaceX had sold the oil rigs, but had not ruled out sea-based platforms for future use.

=== Starlink ===
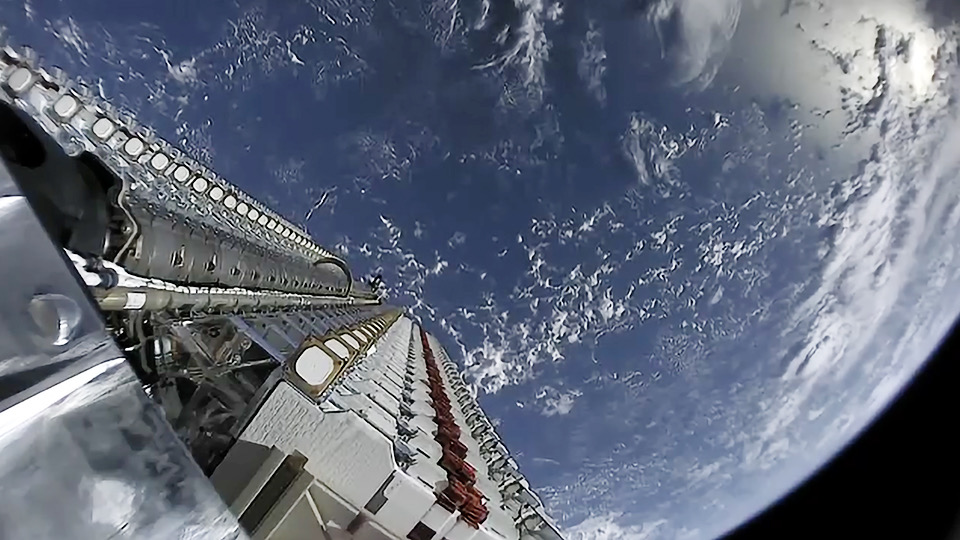
Sixty Starlink satellites stacked together before deployment

Starlink is an internet satellite constellation under development by Starlink Services, LLC, a wholly owned subsidiary of SpaceX, that consists of thousands of cross-linked communications satellites in ~550 km orbits. Its goal is to address the significant unmet demand worldwide for low-cost broadband capabilities. Development began in 2015, and initial prototype test-flight satellites were launched on the SpaceX Paz satellite mission in 2017. In May 2019, SpaceX launched the first batch of 60 satellites aboard a Falcon 9. Initial test operation of the constellation began in late 2020 and first orders were taken in early 2021. Customers were told to expect internet service speeds of 50 Mbit/s to 150 Mbit/s and latency from 20 ms to 40 ms. In December 2022, Starlink reached over 1 million subscribers worldwide. By September 2026, the service had 13.6 million consumer subscribers.

The planned large number of Starlink satellites has been criticized by astronomers due to concerns over light pollution, with the brightness of Starlink satellites in both optical and radio wavelengths interfering with scientific observations. In response, SpaceX implemented several upgrades to Starlink satellites aimed at reducing their brightness. The large number of satellites employed by Starlink also creates long-term dangers of satellite collisions with space debris. However, the satellites are equipped with krypton-fueled Hall thrusters which allow them to de-orbit at the end of their life. They are also designed to autonomously avoid collisions based on uplinked tracking data.

In December 2022, SpaceX announced Starshield, a program to incorporate military or government entity payloads on board a Starlink-derived satellite bus. The Space Development Agency is a key customer procuring satellites for a space-based missile defense system.

In June 2024, SpaceX introduced a compact version of its Starlink antennas, the "Starlink Mini", designed for mobile satellite internet use. Offered for $599 in an early access release, it was more expensive than the base model. The Mini antenna, half the size and one-third the weight of the Standard version, featured a built-in WiFi router, lower power consumption, and over 100 Mbit/s download speeds.

== Facilities ==
SpaceX is headquartered at SpaceX Starbase near Brownsville, Texas, where it manufactures and launches its Starship launch vehicle. Much of the company's engineering, manufacturing, and mission operations remain based at its facility in Hawthorne, California, its headquarters until 2024, where it manufactures Falcon launch vehicles and Dragon spacecraft and operates mission control. The company also operates a rocket development and test facility in McGregor, Texas, and an office in the Washington, D.C., area that supports government customers. SpaceX operates launch facilities in California, Florida, and Texas.

=== Hawthorne, California ===
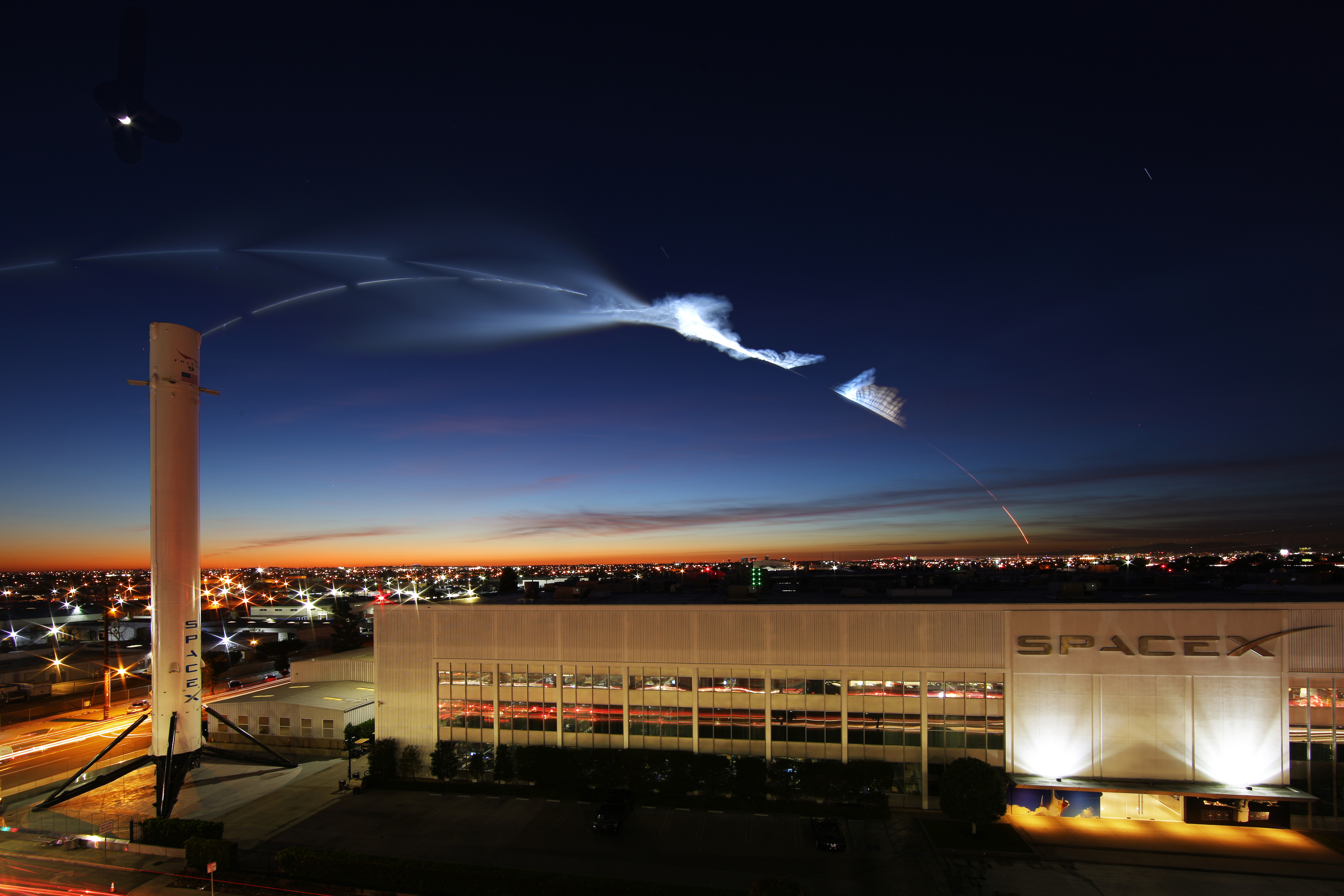
SpaceX office in Hawthorne, California, during a Falcon 9 launch from Vandenberg Space Force Base

SpaceX operates a facility in Hawthorne, California. The three-story building, originally constructed by Northrop Corporation to manufacture Boeing 747 fuselage sections, houses office space, mission control, and Falcon 9 manufacturing operations.

SpaceX manufactures its rocket engines, rocket stages, spacecraft, avionics, and flight software largely in-house. Much of this work is performed at the Hawthorne facility, reflecting the company's emphasis on vertical integration.

The Hawthorne facility served as SpaceX's headquarters until 2024, when Musk announced that the company would move its headquarters to Starbase, Texas.

=== Starbase, Texas ===
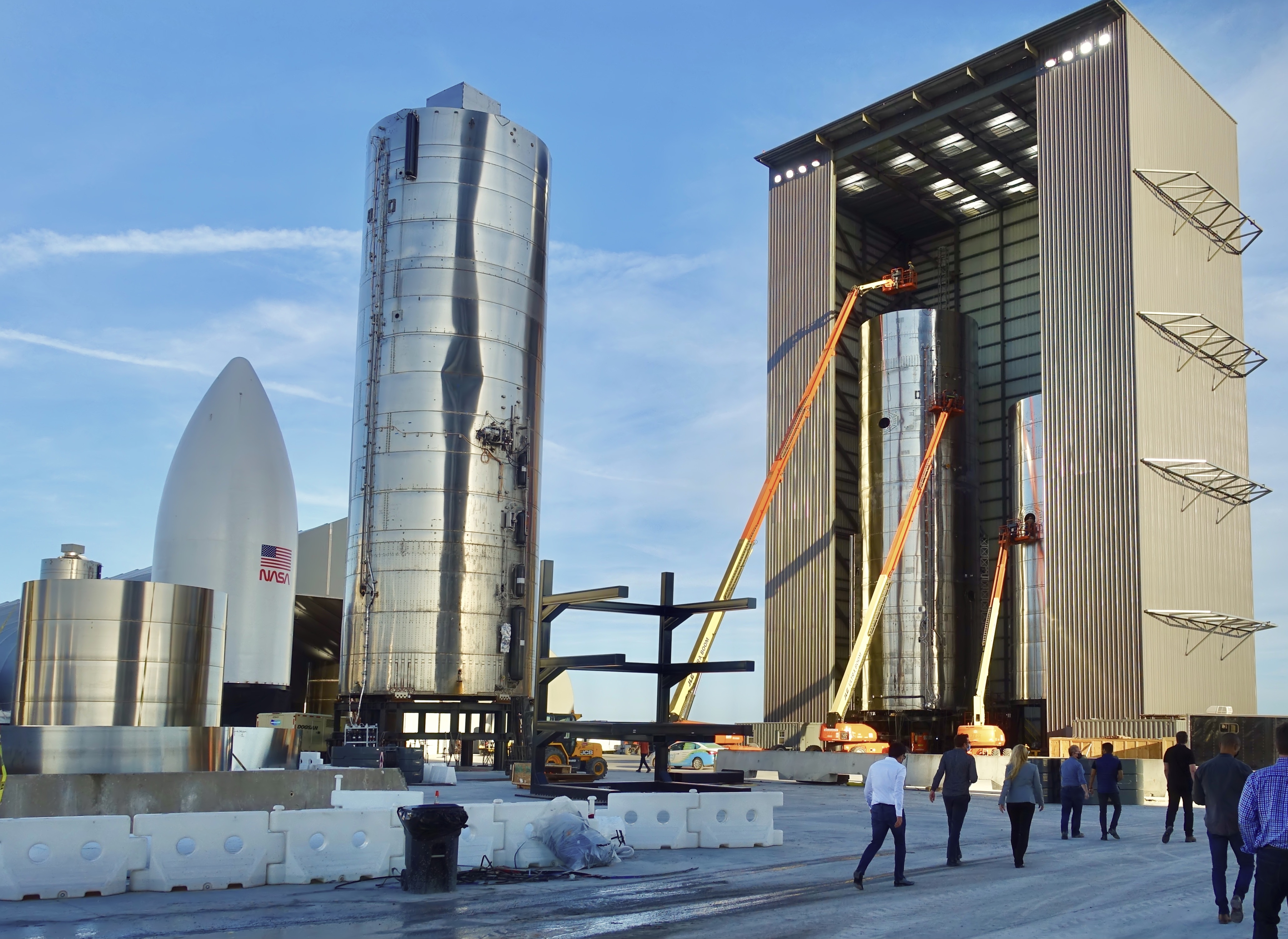
The Starship assembly building at SpaceX Starbase

SpaceX manufactures and launches Starship vehicles from SpaceX Starbase in Boca Chica, Texas, near Brownsville, Texas. The company announced plans for the site in 2014, and began construction later that year. The first suborbital test flights occurred in 2019, followed by orbital launches beginning in 2023.

SpaceX's operations at Starbase have been the subject of environmental reviews and regulatory actions. In August 2024, the Texas Commission on Environmental Quality cited the company for environmental violations related to discharges near the launch site. The Environmental Protection Agency later fined the company approximately $150,000 for alleged violations of the Clean Water Act.

=== McGregor, Texas ===
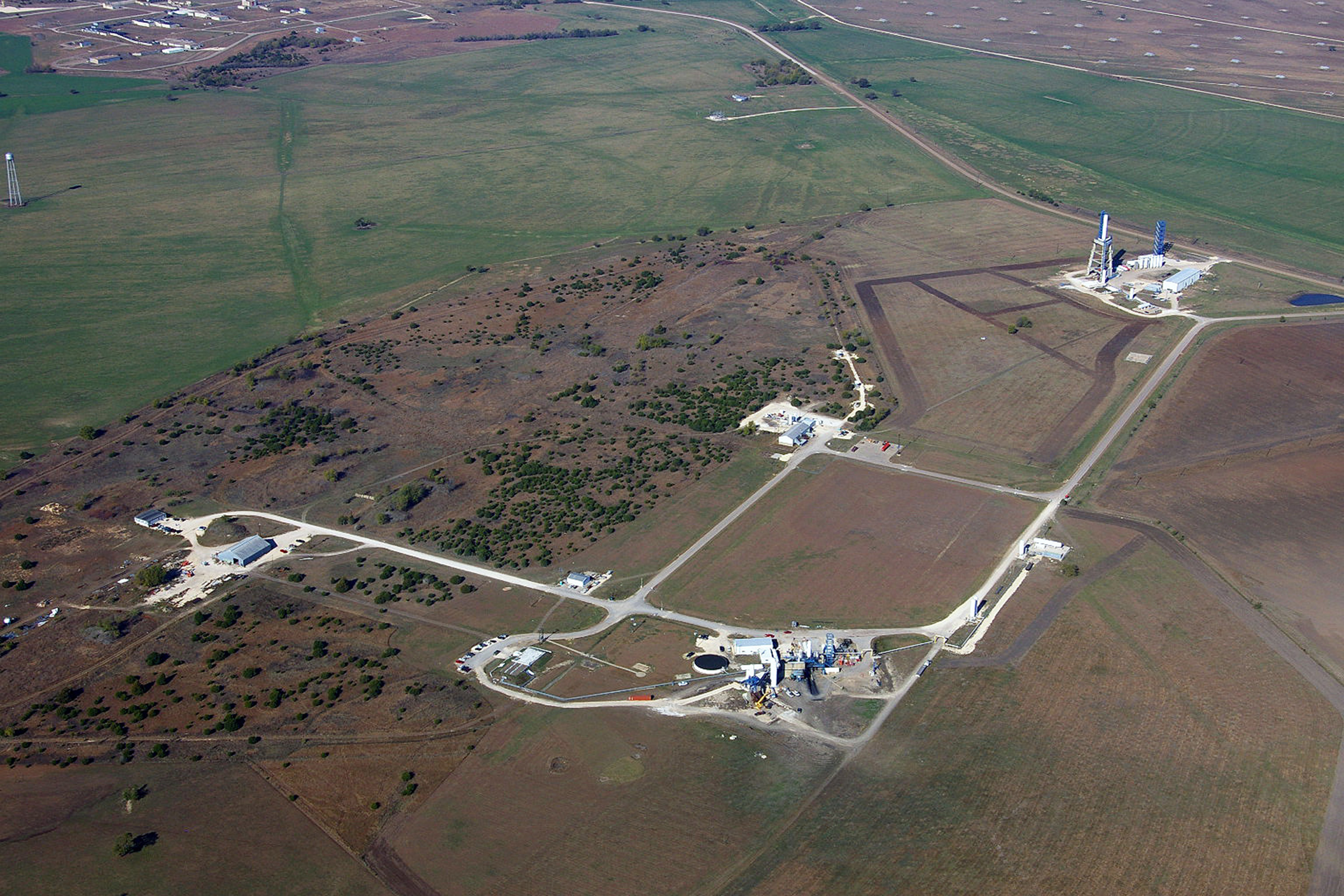
Aerial view of the SpaceX rocket test facility in McGregor, Texas

The SpaceX Rocket Development and Test Facility in McGregor, Texas, is used for rocket engine development and testing. Every SpaceX rocket engine and thruster undergoes acceptance testing at the facility before flight. The site is also used for research, development, and qualification testing of engines and other propulsion components.

Following splashdown and recovery, Dragon spacecraft are transported to McGregor for removal of residual hypergolic propellants before refurbishment elsewhere.

According to SpaceX's 2026 IPO filing, the facility is the company's primary site for qualification, acceptance and post-flight testing of Merlin and Raptor engines, with 15 specialized test stands. In 2015 it had 12 test stands. Company president and chief operating officer Gwynne Shotwell maintains an office at the site.

The property was originally part of the Bluebonnet Ordnance Plant during World War II. It was later used by Beal Aerospace before being leased by SpaceX in 2003. SpaceX expanded the facility from approximately 256 acres (104 ha) in 2003 to 4,000 acres (1,600 ha) by 2015.

In 2021, SpaceX announced plans to construct an additional Raptor engine production facility at McGregor to increase manufacturing capacity.

=== Launch facilities ===
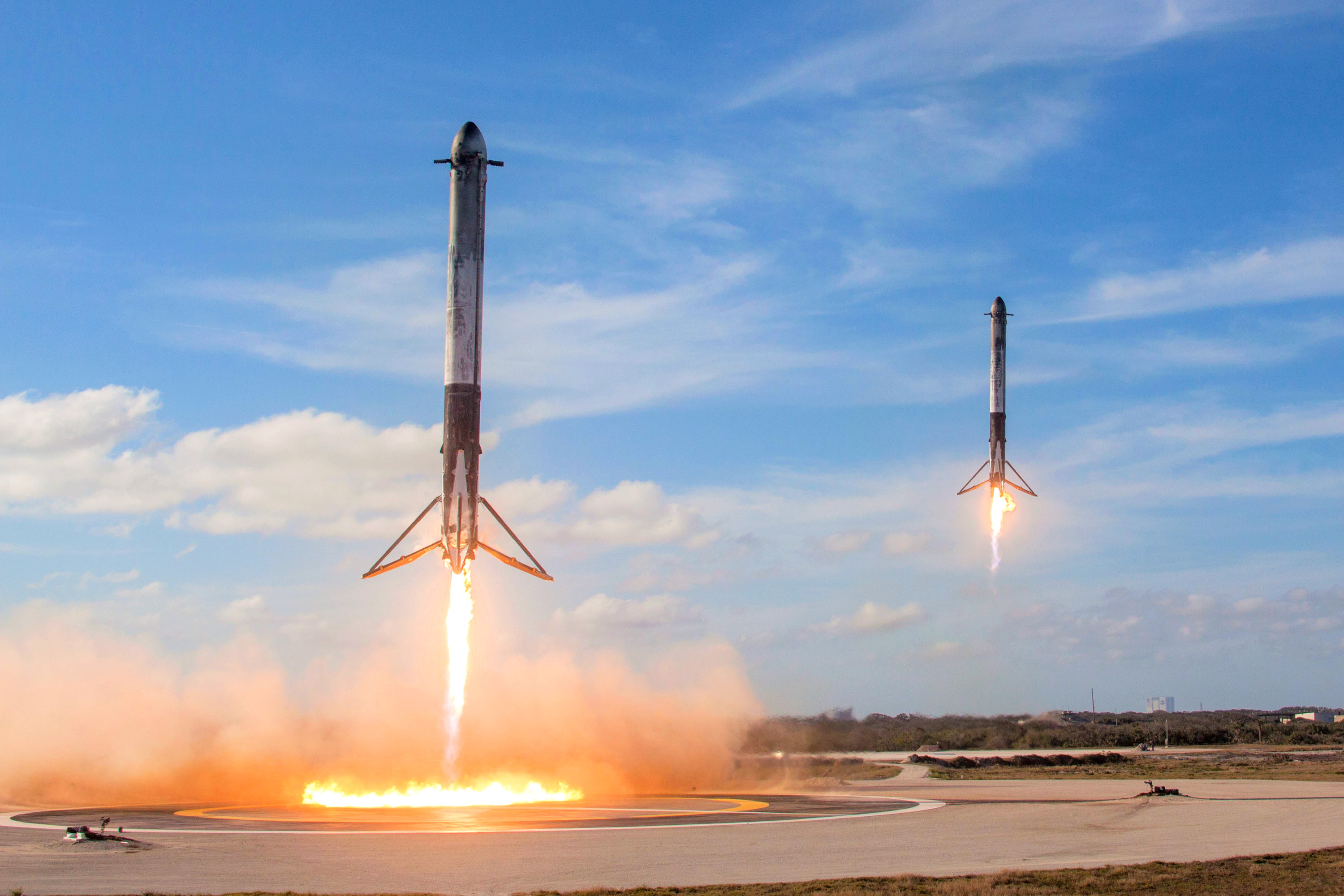
Falcon Heavy Side Boosters landing on LZ1 and LZ2 at Cape Canaveral

SpaceX operates four orbital launch sites, at Cape Canaveral Space Force Station and Kennedy Space Center in Florida and Vandenberg Space Force Base in California for Falcon rockets, and Starbase near Brownsville, Texas for Starship. SpaceX has indicated that they see a niche for each of the four orbital facilities and that they have sufficient launch business to fill each pad. The Vandenberg launch site enables highly inclined orbits (66–145°), while Cape Canaveral and Kennedy enable orbits of medium inclination (28.5–55°). Larger inclinations, including SSO, are possible from Florida by overflying Cuba.

Before it was retired, all Falcon 1 launches took place at the Ronald Reagan Ballistic Missile Defense Test Site on Omelek Island of the Marshall Islands.

In April 2007, the Pentagon approved the use of Cape Canaveral Space Launch Complex 40 (SLC-40) by SpaceX. The site has been used since 2010 for Falcon 9 launches, mainly to low Earth and geostationary orbits.

The former Launch Complex 13 at Cape Canaveral, renamed Landing Zones 1 and 2, has been used since 2015 for Falcon 9 first-stage booster landings. LZ-40 at Space Launch Complex 40 has largely replaced LZ-1, though SpaceX returned LZ-1 to service for the Falcon Heavy NROL-97 mission in October 2026. SpaceX has constructed new return-to-launch-site landing facilities at Launch Complex 39A and Space Launch Complex 40.

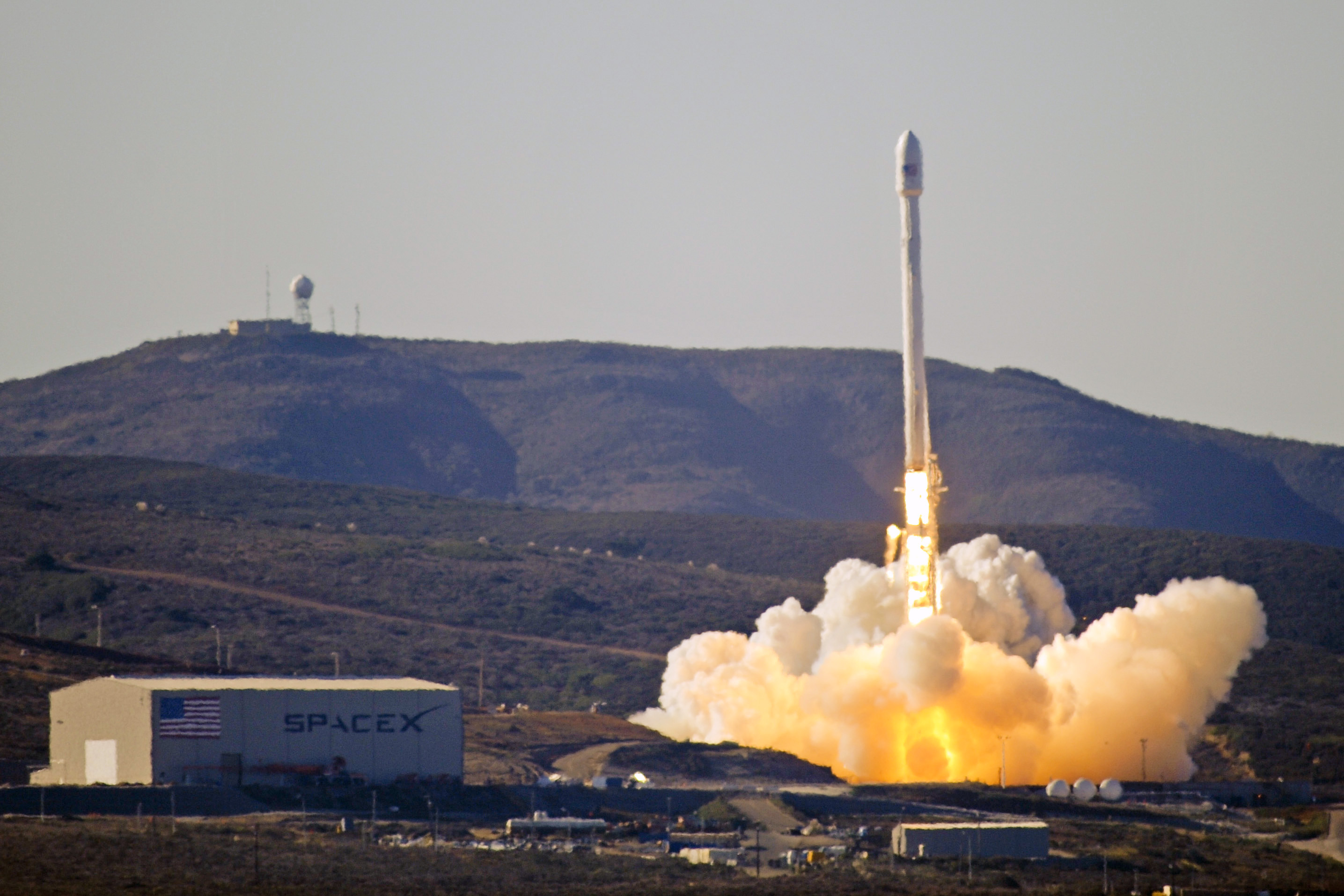
SpaceX west coast launch facility at Vandenberg Space Force Base, during the launch of CASSIOPE

Vandenberg Space Launch Complex 4 (SLC-4E) was leased from the military in 2011 and is used for payloads to polar orbits. The Vandenberg site can launch both Falcon 9 and Falcon Heavy vehicles, but cannot launch to low inclination orbits. The neighboring SLC-4W was converted to Landing Zone 4 in 2015 for booster landings.

On April 14, 2014, SpaceX signed a 20-year lease for Kennedy Space Center Launch Complex 39A. The pad was subsequently modified to support Falcon 9 and Falcon Heavy launches. SpaceX launched its first crewed mission to the ISS from Launch Pad 39A on May 30, 2020. Pad 39A has been prepared since 2019 to eventually accommodate Starship launches. In June 2022, SpaceX began stacking a Starship launch tower at the pad. As of November 2026, the first Starship launch from the pad is expected to be the vehicle's sixteenth flight.

In August 2026, The New York Times reported that SpaceX planned a second private spaceport in Louisiana, described as a multi-pad Starship complex after Starbase in Texas.

On August 30, 2026, a Falcon Heavy launched NASA's Nancy Grace Roman Space Telescope from Kennedy Space Center Launch Complex 39A.

== Contracts ==
SpaceX won demonstration and actual supply contracts from NASA for the International Space Station (ISS) with technology the company developed. SpaceX is also certified for U.S. military launches of Evolved Expendable Launch Vehicle-class (EELV) payloads.

=== Cargo to International Space Station (ISS) ===
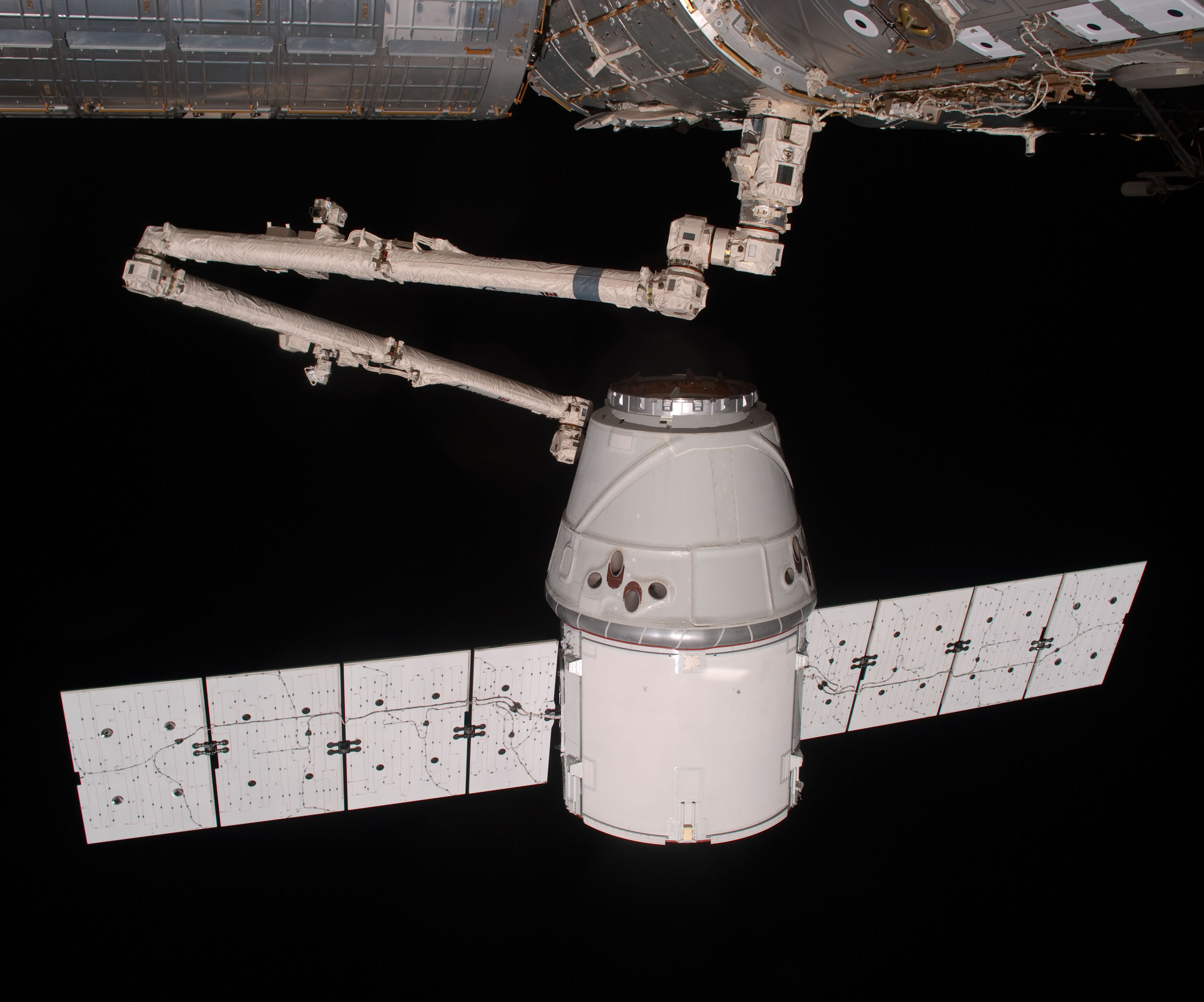
The COTS 2 Dragon is berthed to the International Space Station (ISS) by Canadarm2.

In 2006, SpaceX won a NASA Commercial Orbital Transportation Services (COTS) Phase 1 contract to demonstrate cargo delivery to the ISS, with a possible contract option for crew transport. Through this contract, designed by NASA to provide "seed money" through Space Act Agreements for developing new capabilities, NASA paid SpaceX $396 million to develop the cargo configuration of the Dragon spacecraft, while SpaceX developed the Falcon 9 launch vehicle with their resources. These Space Act Agreements have been shown to have saved NASA millions of dollars in development costs, making rocket development 4–10 times less expensive than if produced by NASA alone.

In December 2010, with the launch of the SpaceX COTS Demo Flight 1 mission, SpaceX became the first private company to successfully launch, orbit, and recover a spacecraft. Dragon successfully berthed with the ISS during SpaceX COTS Demo Flight 2 in May 2012, a first for a private spacecraft.

Commercial Resupply Services (CRS) is a series of contracts awarded by NASA from 2008 to 2016 for the delivery of cargo and supplies to the ISS on commercially operated spacecraft. The first CRS contracts were signed in 2008 and awarded $1.6 billion to SpaceX for 12 cargo transport missions, covering deliveries to 2016. SpaceX CRS-1, the first of the 12 planned resupply missions, launched in October 2012, achieved orbit, berthed, and remained on station for 20 days, before re-entering the atmosphere and splashing down in the Pacific Ocean.

CRS missions have flown approximately twice a year to the ISS since then. In 2015, NASA extended the Phase 1 contracts by ordering an additional three resupply flights from SpaceX, and then extended the contract further for a total of twenty cargo missions to the ISS. The final Dragon 1 mission, SpaceX CRS-20, departed the ISS in April 2020, and Dragon was subsequently retired from service. A second phase of contracts was awarded in January 2016 with SpaceX as one of the awardees. SpaceX will fly up to nine additional CRS flights with the upgraded Dragon 2 spacecraft. In March 2020, NASA contracted SpaceX to develop the Dragon XL spacecraft to send supplies to the Lunar Gateway space station. Dragon XL will be launched on a Falcon Heavy.

=== Crewing ===
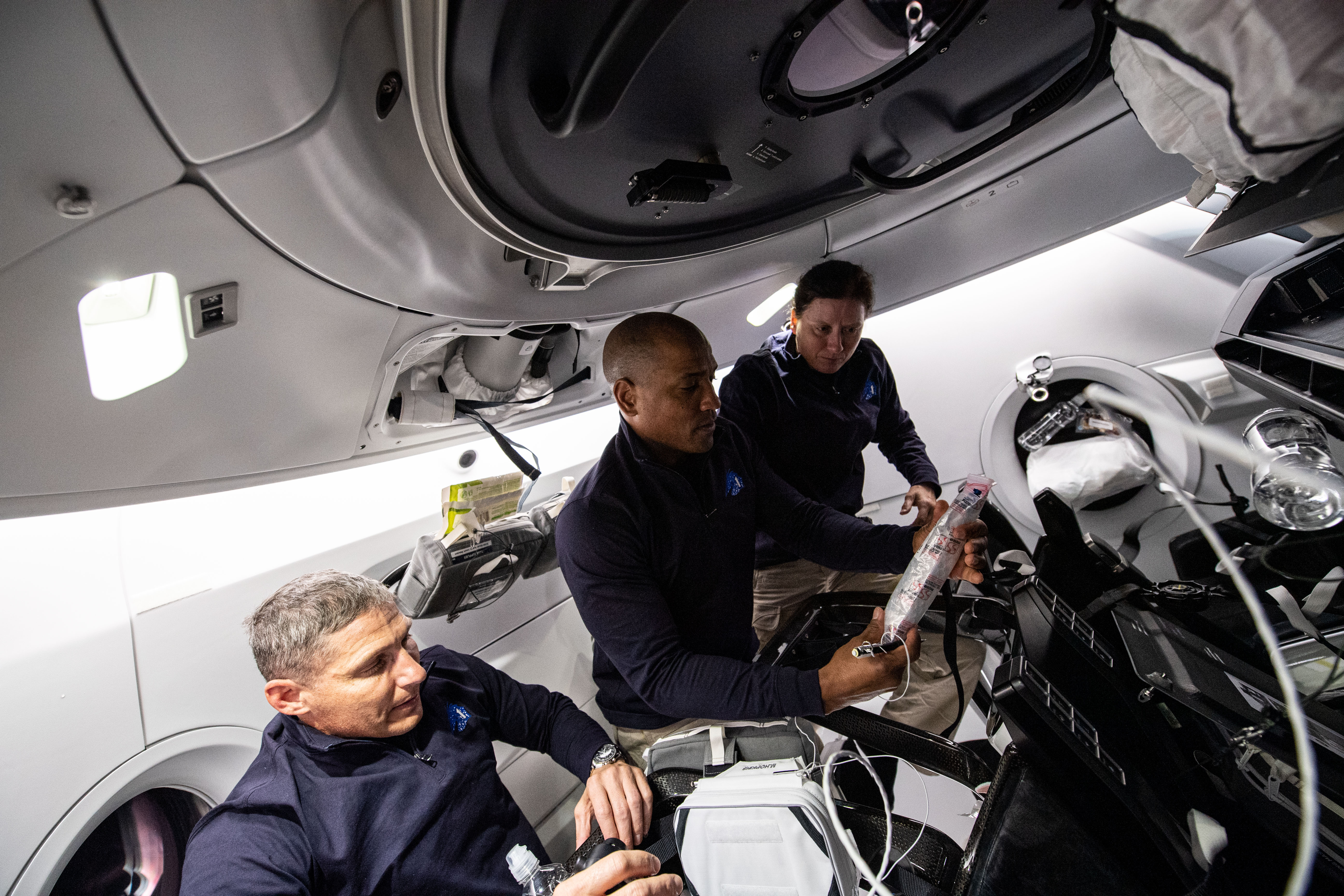
NASA astronauts inside the Dragon spacecraft during the Crew-1 mission rendezvous with the International Space Station

SpaceX is responsible for the transportation of NASA astronauts to and from the ISS. The NASA contracts started as part of the Commercial Crew Development (CCDev) program, aimed at developing commercially operated spacecraft capable of delivering astronauts to the ISS. The first contract was awarded to SpaceX in 2011, followed by another in 2012 to continue development and testing of its Dragon 2 spacecraft.

In September 2014, NASA chose SpaceX and Boeing as the two companies that would be funded to develop systems to transport U.S. crews to and from the ISS. SpaceX won $2.6 billion to complete and certify Dragon 2 by 2017. The contracts called for at least one crewed flight test with at least one NASA astronaut aboard. Once Crew Dragon received NASA human-spaceflight certification, the contract required SpaceX to conduct at least two, and as many as six, crewed missions to the space station.

SpaceX completed the first key flight test of its Crew Dragon spacecraft, a Pad Abort Test, in May 2015, and successfully conducted a full uncrewed test flight in March 2019. The capsule docked to the ISS and then splashed down in the Atlantic Ocean. In January 2020, SpaceX conducted an in-flight abort test, the last test flight before flying crew, in which the Dragon spacecraft fired its launch escape engines in a simulated abort scenario.

On May 30, 2020, the Crew Dragon Demo-2 mission was launched to the International Space Station with NASA astronauts Bob Behnken and Doug Hurley, the first time a crewed vehicle had launched from the U.S. since 2011, and the first SpaceX commercial crewed launch to the ISS. The Crew-1 mission was successfully launched to the International Space Station on November 16, 2020, with NASA astronauts Michael S. Hopkins, Victor Glover and Shannon Walker along with JAXA astronaut Soichi Noguchi, all members of the Expedition 64 crew. On April 23, 2021, Crew-2 was launched to the International Space Station with NASA astronauts Shane Kimbrough and K. Megan McArthur, JAXA astronaut Akihiko Hoshide, and ESA astronaut Thomas Pesquet. The Crew-2 mission successfully docked on April 24, 2021.

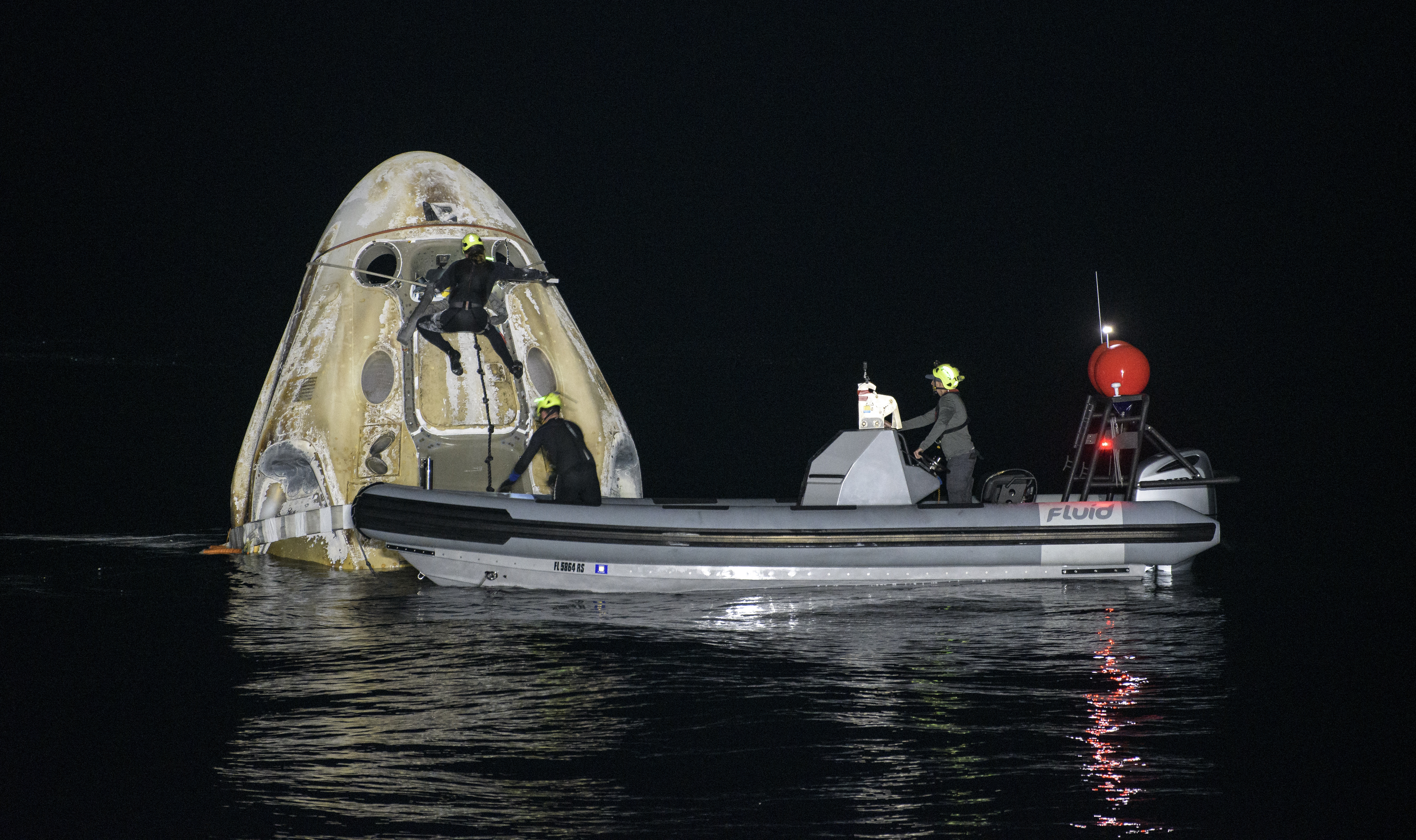
Resilience after splashdown

SpaceX also offers paid crewed spaceflights for private individuals. The first of these missions, Inspiration4, launched in 2021 on behalf of Shift4 Payments CEO Jared Isaacman. The mission launched the Crew Dragon Resilience from the Florida Kennedy Space Center's Launch Complex 39A atop a Falcon 9 launch vehicle, placed the Dragon capsule into low Earth orbit, and ended successfully about three days later when the Resilience splashed down in the Atlantic Ocean. All four crew members received commercial astronaut training from SpaceX. The training included lessons in orbital mechanics, operating in a microgravity environment, stress testing, emergency-preparedness training, and mission simulations.

=== National defense ===
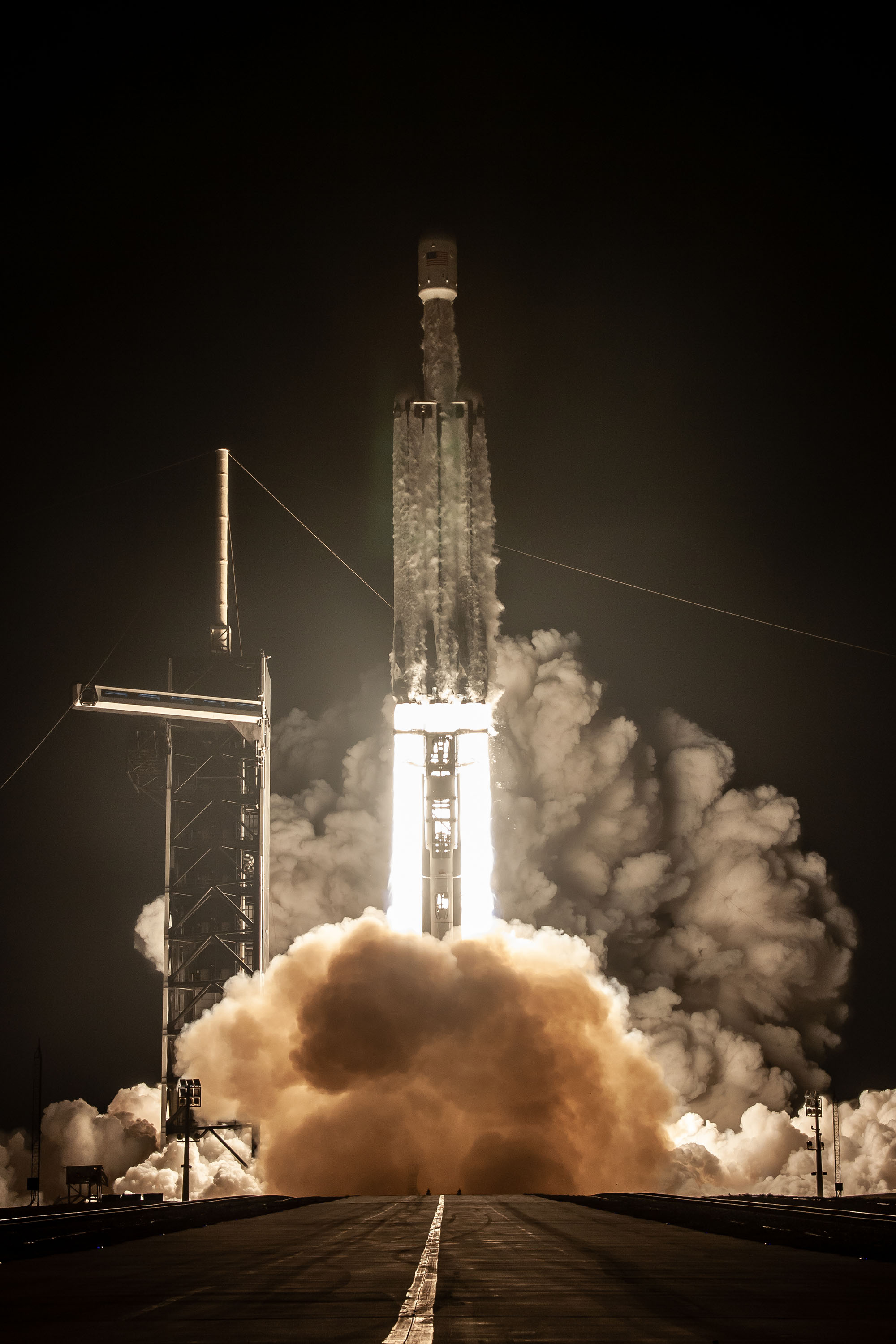
Launch of the STP-2 mission on a Falcon Heavy in June 2019

In 2005, SpaceX announced that it had been awarded an Indefinite Delivery/Indefinite Quantity (IDIQ) contract, allowing the United States Air Force to purchase up to $100 million worth of launches from the company. Three years later, NASA announced that it had awarded an IDIQ Launch Services contract to SpaceX for up to $1 billion, depending on the number of missions awarded. In December 2012, SpaceX announced its first two launch contracts with the United States Department of Defense (DoD). The United States Air Force Space and Missile Systems Center awarded SpaceX two EELV-class missions: Deep Space Climate Observatory (DSCOVR) and Space Test Program 2 (STP-2). DSCOVR was launched on a Falcon 9 launch vehicle in 2015, while STP-2 was launched on a Falcon Heavy on June 25, 2019.

The Falcon 9 v1.1 was certified for National Security Space Launch (NSSL) in 2015, allowing SpaceX to contract launch services to the Air Force for any payloads classified under national security. This broke the monopoly held since 2006 by United Launch Alliance (ULA) over U.S. Air Force launches of classified payloads. In April 2016, the U.S. Air Force awarded the first such national security launch to SpaceX to launch the second GPS III satellite for $82.7 million. This was approximately 40% less than the estimated cost for similar previous missions. SpaceX also launched the third GPS III launch on June 20, 2020. In March 2018, SpaceX secured an additional $290 million contract from the U.S. Air Force to launch another three GPS III satellites.

The U.S. National Reconnaissance Office (NRO) also purchased launches from SpaceX, with the first taking place on May 1, 2017. In February 2019, SpaceX secured a $297 million contract from the U.S. Air Force to launch another three national security missions, all slated to launch no earlier than FY 2021. In August 2020, the U.S. Space Force awarded its National Security Space Launch (NSSL) contracts for the following 5–7 years. SpaceX won a contract for $316 million for one launch. In addition, SpaceX handled 40% of the U.S. military's satellite launch requirements over the period.

SpaceX also designs and launches custom military satellites for the Space Development Agency as part of a new missile defense system in low Earth orbit. The constellation would give the United States capabilities to sense, target and potentially intercept nuclear missiles and hypersonic weapons launched from anywhere on Earth. Both China and Russia brought concerns to the United Nations about the program, and various organizations warn it could be destabilizing and trigger an arms race in space.

In March 2024, Reuters reported that, as part of a $1.8 billion contract signed with the National Reconnaissance Office in 2021, SpaceX is building a network of hundreds of spy satellites. This new network, Reuters reported, would be able to operate as a swarm in low orbits.

In the third quarter of 2026, SpaceX signed contracts for 18 additional National Security Space Launch missions. The classified USSF-432 mission for the Space Force, launched from Vandenberg on November 6, 2026, was the fourteenth national-security Falcon 9 launch of the year.

== Launch market competition and pricing pressure ==
SpaceX's low launch prices, especially for communications satellites flying to geostationary transfer orbit (GTO), have resulted in market pressure on its competitors to lower their own prices. Prior to 2013, the openly competed comsat launch market had been dominated by Arianespace (flying the Ariane 5) and International Launch Services (flying the Proton). With a published price of $56.5 million per launch to low Earth orbit, Falcon 9 rockets were the least expensive in the industry. European satellite operators are pushing the ESA to reduce launch prices of the Ariane 5 and Ariane 6 rockets as a result of competition from SpaceX.

SpaceX ended the United Launch Alliance (ULA) monopoly of U.S. military payloads when it began to compete for national security launches. In 2015, anticipating a slump in domestic, military, and spy launches, ULA stated that it would go out of business unless it won commercial satellite launch orders. To that end, ULA announced a major restructuring of processes and workforce to decrease launch costs by half.

Congressional testimony by SpaceX in 2017 suggested that the NASA Space Act Agreement process of "setting only a high-level requirement for cargo transport to the space station [while] leaving the details to industry" had allowed SpaceX to design and develop the Falcon 9 rocket on its own at a substantially lower cost. According to NASA's own independently verified numbers, SpaceX's total development cost for the Falcon 9 rocket, including the Falcon 1 rocket, was estimated at $390 million. In 2011, NASA estimated that it would have cost the agency about $4 billion to develop a rocket like the Falcon 9 booster based upon NASA's traditional contracting processes, about ten times more. In May 2020, NASA administrator Jim Bridenstine remarked that thanks to NASA's investments into SpaceX, the United States has 70% of the commercial launch market, a major improvement since 2012 when there were no commercial launches from the country.

As of 2024, SpaceX operates a Rideshare and Bandwagon (mid inclination) programs. This provides additional competition for small satellite launchers.

== Leverage over governments ==
In 2025, SpaceX had a 75% market share for all space launches. Researchers noted this was higher than the peak control of the East India Company (which had a private army and ruled India as if it were a government) over maritime trade between Europe and Asia in the 1820s. They warned that the leverage this creates over governments is dangerous, pointing to Elon Musk's threat to cut the United States off from the International Space Station by decomissioning the Dragon capsule and potential monopoly over access to the Moon. SpaceX has also exercised leverage by throttling the Starlink services available during the Russo-Ukrainian war.

== Corporate affairs ==
=== Business trends ===
Year	Revenue (billion USD)	Valuation (billion USD)	Number of employees
2002			c. 30
2003			
2004			
2005			c. 90 (Feb.) c. 160 (Nov.)
2006			
2007			c. 350 (Aug.)
2008			c. 600 (Dec.)
2009			> 800 (Dec.)
2010			> 1,000 (Jun.)
2011			c. 1,300 (Jan.)
2012		2.4 (Jun.)	c. 1,800 (May)
2013			c. 3,800 (Oct.)
2014		10 (Aug.)	
2015		12 (Jan.)	
2016		15 (Nov.)	c. 5,000 (Nov.)
2017		21 (Nov.)	c. 7,000 (Nov.)
2018		27 (Apr.)	
2019		33 (May)	> 6,000 (Jul.)
2020		46 (Aug.)	
2021	$2.3	74 (Feb.); 100 (Oct.)	> 9,500 (Mar.)
2022	$4.6	127 (Aug.)	c. 12,000 (Apr.)
2023	$9	137 (Jan.); 180 (Dec.)	> 13,000 (Sep.)
2024	$14.0 (incl. xAI)	350 (Dec.)	
2025	$18.7 (incl. xAI)	400 (Jul.); 800 (Dec.)	
2026		1000 (Jan.); 1250 (Feb.); 2000 (Jun.); 1900 (Nov.)	22,000 (Mar.)

=== Board of directors ===
SpaceX board of directors as of June 2026
Joined board	Name	Titles	Independent
2002	Elon Musk	Founder, chairman, CEO and CTO of SpaceX; CEO, Product Architect, and former chairman of Tesla; former chairman of SolarCity	N/A
2009	Gwynne Shotwell	President and COO of SpaceX	N/A
2009	Luke Nosek	Co-founder, PayPal and Founders Fund	Yes
2009	Steve Jurvetson	Co-founder, Future Ventures fund; former board member of Tesla	Yes
2010	Antonio Gracias	CEO and Chairman of the Investment Committee at Valor Equity Partners; board member of Neuralink Corp; board member of The Boring Company; former board member of Tesla and SolarCity	No
2015	Donald Harrison	President of global partnerships and corporate development, Google	Yes
2026	Ira Ehrenpreis	Founder and managing member of DBL Partners, an impact investing venture; board member of Tesla	Yes
2026	Randy Glein	Co-founder and managing partner of DFJ Growth (Draper Fisher Jurvetson), a venture capital firm	Yes
2026	Roelof Botha	Managing partner, Sequoia Capital; former chief financial officer, PayPal	Yes

=== Leadership changes ===
In November 2022, to focus on Starship, the company announced COO Gwynne Shotwell and vice president Mark Juncosa would oversee Starbase, its Texas launch facility, along with Omead Afshar, who at the time oversaw operations for Tesla in Texas. Shyamal Patel, who was senior director of operations at the site, would shift to its Cape Canaveral site.

=== Net operating loss carryforwards ===
As of 2024, SpaceX had a carryforward of $5 billion in net operating losses that can be used to offset taxes due on its next $5 billion of income; as a result, the company had likely paid little to no federal income tax since it was founded.

=== Workplace culture ===
According to former NASA deputy administrator Lori Garver in 2022, the company overall has a male-dominated "bro culture", similar to that of the spaceflight industry in general. In December 2021, claims of workplace sexual harassment from five former SpaceX employees, ranging from interns to full engineers, were published. The former employees claimed to have experienced unwanted advances and uncomfortable interactions. Additionally, the accounts included claims of a culture of sexual harassment existing at the company and one where complaints made to executives, managers, and human resources officers went largely unaddressed.

In May 2022, an anonymous friend of a SpaceX flight attendant alleged that Musk engaged in sexual misconduct with such SpaceX flight attendant in a private jet in 2016 and that the company paid her $250,000 for her silence. Musk denied the allegation. In response to the report, some employees collaborated on an open letter condemning "Elon's harmful Twitter behavior". The letter also asked the company to clearly define and consistently enforce its "no-asshole" and "zero tolerance" policies. On June 16, Gwynne Shotwell told employees that the company had terminated "a number of employees involved" with the letter. She said that unsolicited emails and unsponsored surveys had been sent during the workday and that some employees felt pressured to sign.

The company has also been described as having a work culture that pushes employees to work excessively and is described as fostering a burnout culture. According to a memo by Blue Origin, a rival aerospace company with a history of lawsuits and anti-SpaceX political lobbying, SpaceX expected very long work hours, work on weekends, and limited use of holidays.

In 2023, SpaceX employees alleged that the company's rush to colonize space has resulted in injuries. An examination of OSHA's records revealed injury rates higher than the industry's averages. In addition, in 2023, Reuters documented at least 600 previously unreported workplace injuries at SpaceX since 2014, including "crushed limbs, amputations, electrocutions, head and eye wounds and one death", Lonnie LeBlanc, a former United States Marine who was blown off a trailer by the wind while attempting to hold its cargo load down.

In June 2024, eight ex-employees, the same who had previously been fired for penning the open letter against Elon Musk, filed a lawsuit against Musk and SpaceX alleging sexual harassment and discrimination. The lawsuit has since stalled on questions of which court has jurisdiction over SpaceX's headquarters.
