= SpaceX rocket engines =

Rocket engines developed by SpaceX

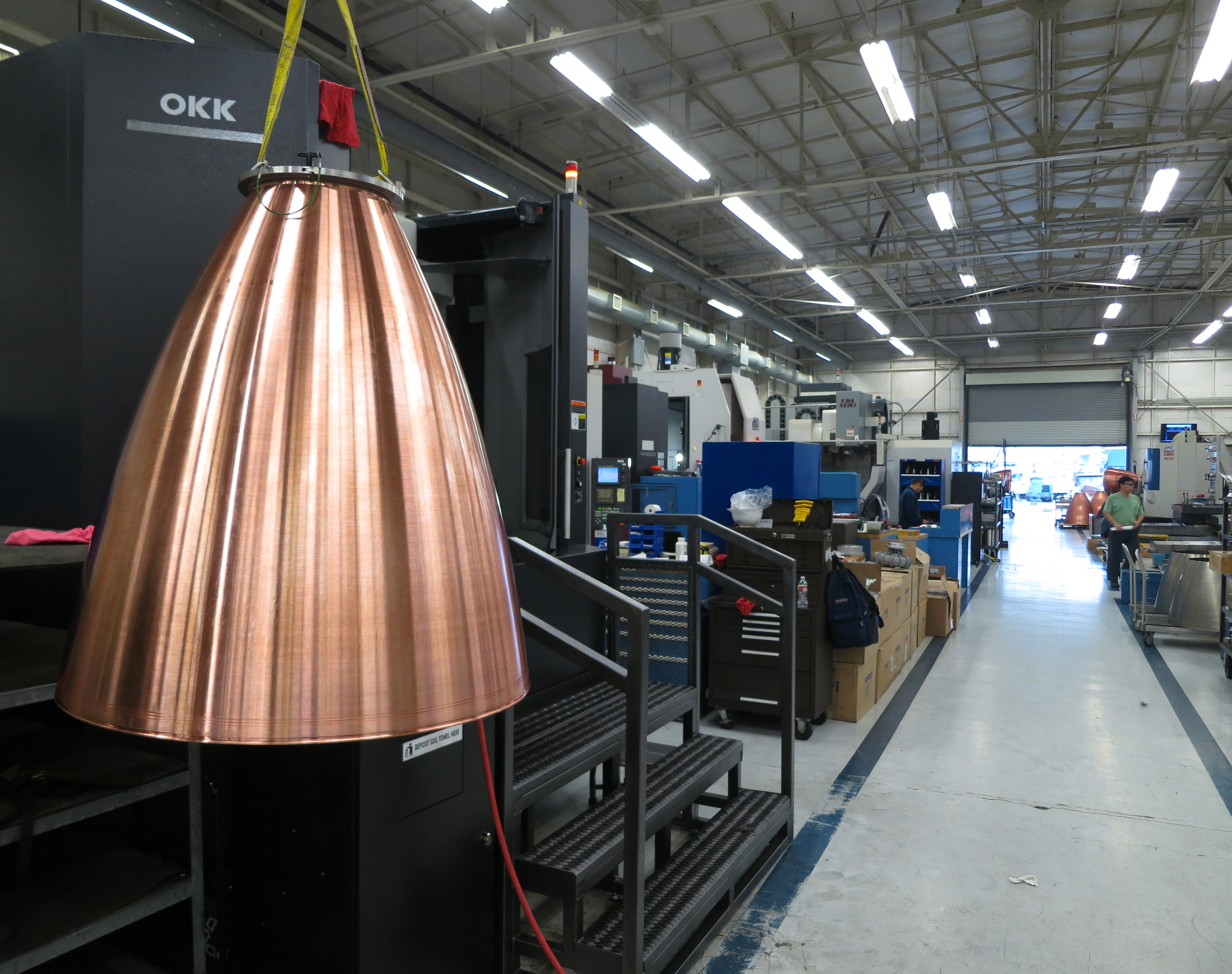
Channels etched into the Merlin 1D nozzle enable regenerative cooling preventing exhaust heat from melting it.

Since the founding of SpaceX in 2002, the company has developed four families of rocket engines — Merlin, Kestrel, Draco and SuperDraco — and since 2016 developed the Raptor methane rocket engine and after 2020, a line of methalox thrusters.

== History ==
In the first ten years of SpaceX, led by engineer Tom Mueller, the company developed a variety of liquid-propellant rocket engines, with at least one more of that type under development. As of October 2012, each of the engines developed to date—Kestrel, Merlin 1, Draco and Super Draco—had been developed for initial use in the SpaceX launch vehicles—Falcon 1, Falcon 9, and Falcon Heavy—or for the Dragon capsule. Each main engine developed by 2012 has been Kerosene-based, using RP-1 as the fuel with liquid oxygen (LOX) as the oxidizer, while the RCS control thruster engines have used storable hypergolic propellants.

In November 2012, at a meeting of the Royal Aeronautical Society in London, United Kingdom, SpaceX announced that they planned to develop methane-based engines for their future rockets. These engines would use staged cycle combustion, for higher efficiency similar to the system used on the former Soviet Union's NK-33 engine.

By mid-2015, SpaceX had developed a total of 9 rocket engines architectures in the first 13 years of the company's existence.

== Kerosene-based engines ==
SpaceX has developed two kerosene-based engines through 2013, the Merlin 1 and Kestrel, and has publicly discussed a much larger concept engine high-level design named Merlin 2. Merlin 1 powered the first stage of the Falcon 1 launch vehicle and is used both on the first and second stages of the Falcon 9 and Falcon Heavy launch vehicles. The Falcon 1 second stage was powered by a Kestrel engine.

=== Merlin 1 ===
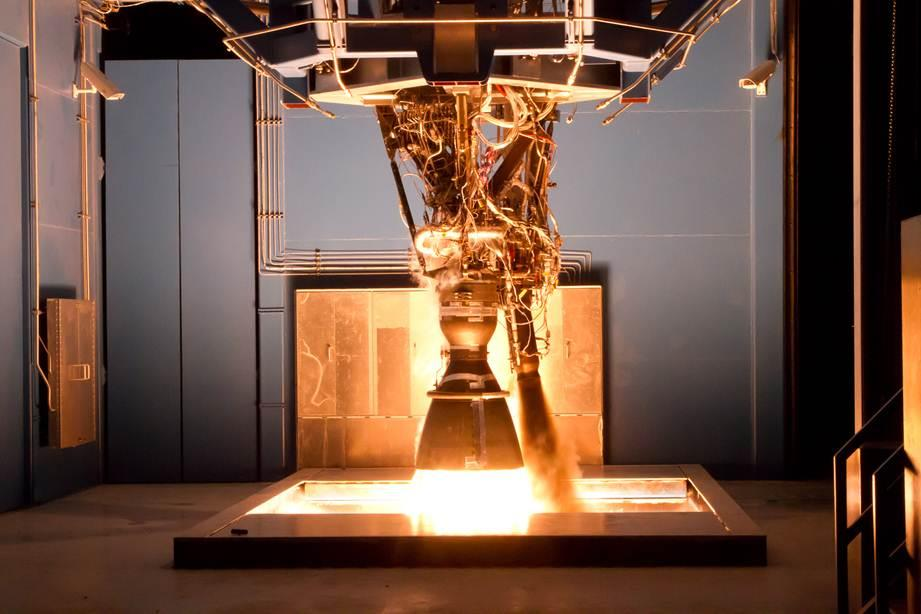
Test firing of the Merlin 1D at SpaceX's McGregor test stand

Merlin 1 is a family of LOX/RP-1 rocket engines developed 2003–2012. Merlin 1A and Merlin 1B utilized an ablatively-cooled carbon-fiber composite nozzle. Merlin 1A produced 340 kilonewtons (76,000 lb_{f}) of thrust and was used to power the first stage of the first two Falcon 1 flights in 2006 and 2007. Merlin 1B had a somewhat more powerful turbo-pump, and generated more thrust, but was never flown on a flight vehicle before SpaceX's move to the Merlin 1C.

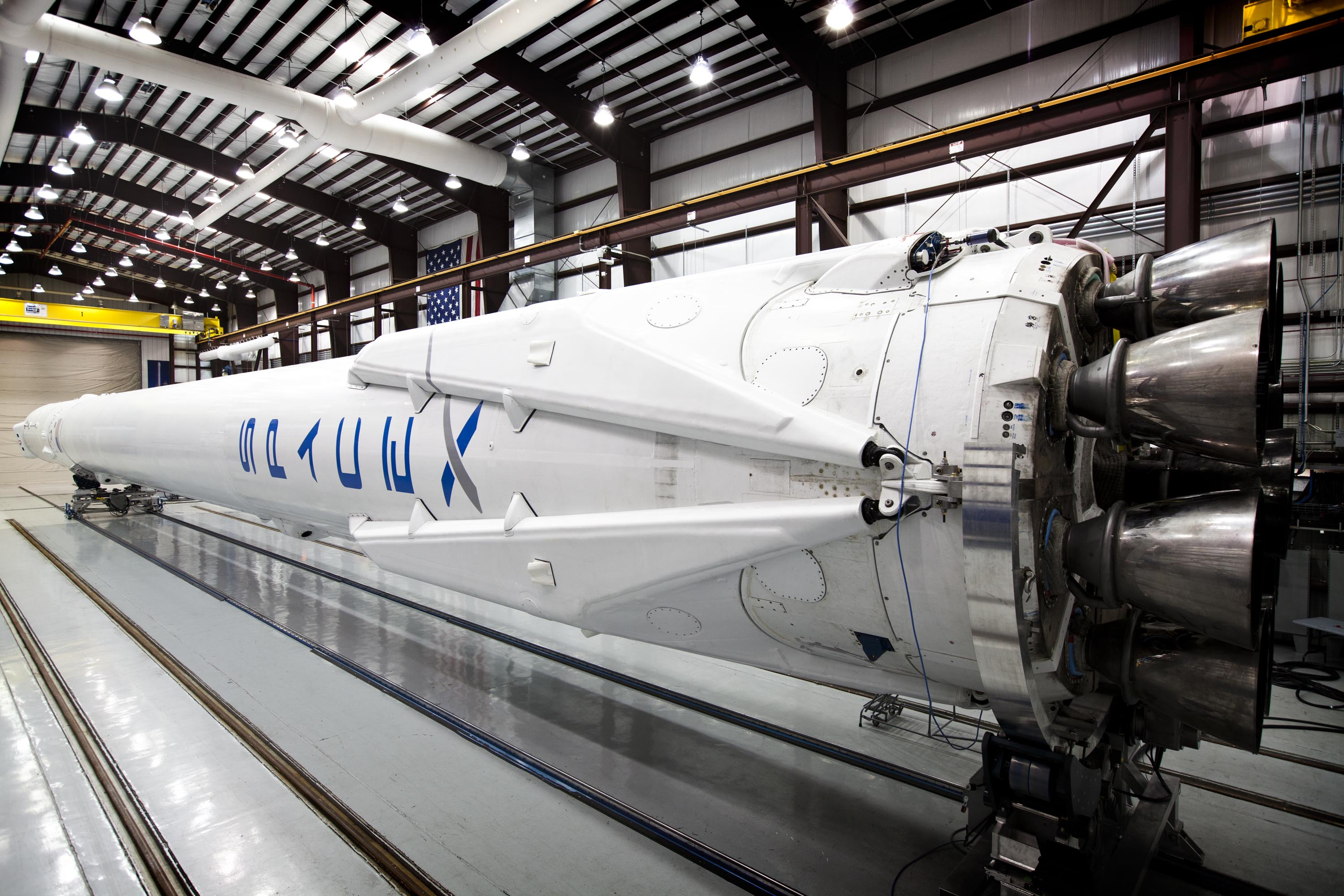
Merlin 1D rocket engines on a Falcon 9 v1.1 launch vehicle in SLC-40 hangar, April 2014

The Merlin 1C was the first in the family to use a regeneratively-cooled nozzle and combustion chamber. It was first fired with a full mission duty firing in 2007, first flew on the third Falcon 1 mission in August 2008, powered the "first privately-developed liquid-fueled rocket to successfully reach orbit" (Falcon 1 Flight 4) in September 2008, and subsequently powered the first five Falcon 9 flights — each flown with a version 1.0 Falcon 9 launch vehicle — from 2010 through 2013.

The Merlin 1D, developed in 2011–2012 also has a regeneratively-cooled nozzle and combustion chamber. It has a vacuum thrust of 690 kN (155,000 lbf), a vacuum specific impulse (I_{sp}) of 310 s, an increased expansion ratio of 16 (as opposed to the previous 14.5 of the Merlin 1C) and chamber pressure of 9.7 MPa (1,410 psi). A new feature for the engine is the ability to throttle from 100% to 70%. The engine's 150:1 thrust-to-weight ratio is the highest ever achieved for a rocket engine. The first flight of the Merlin 1D engine was also the maiden Falcon 9 v1.1 flight. On September 29, 2013, the Falcon 9 Flight 6 mission successfully launched the Canadian Space Agency's CASSIOPE satellite into polar orbit, and proved that the Merlin 1D could be restarted to control the first stage's re-entry back into the atmosphere—part of the SpaceX reusable launch system flight test program—a necessary step in making the rocket reusable.

=== Kestrel ===
Kestrel was a LOX/RP-1 pressure-fed rocket engine, and was developed by SpaceX as the Falcon 1 rocket's second stage main engine; it was used in 2006–2009. It was built around the same pintle architecture as SpaceX's Merlin engine but does not have a turbo-pump, and is fed only by tank pressure. Its nozzle was ablatively-cooled in the chamber and radiatively-cooled in the throat, and is fabricated from a high strength niobium alloy. Thrust vector control is provided by electro-mechanical actuators on the engine dome for pitch and yaw. Roll control – and attitude control during the coast phase – is provided by helium cold gas thrusters.

== Methane-based engines ==
In November 2012, methalox engines came on the scene when SpaceX CEO Elon Musk announced a new direction for propulsion side of the company: developing methane/LOX rocket engines. SpaceX work on methane/LOX (methalox) engines is strictly to support the company's Mars technology development program. They had no plans to build an upper stage engine for the Falcon 9 or Falcon Heavy using methalox propellant. However, on November 7, 2018, Elon Musk tweeted, "Falcon 9 second stage will be upgraded to be like a mini-BFR Ship," which may imply the use of a Raptor engine on this new second stage. The focus of the new engine development program is exclusively on the full-size Raptor engine for the Mars-focused mission.

=== Raptor ===
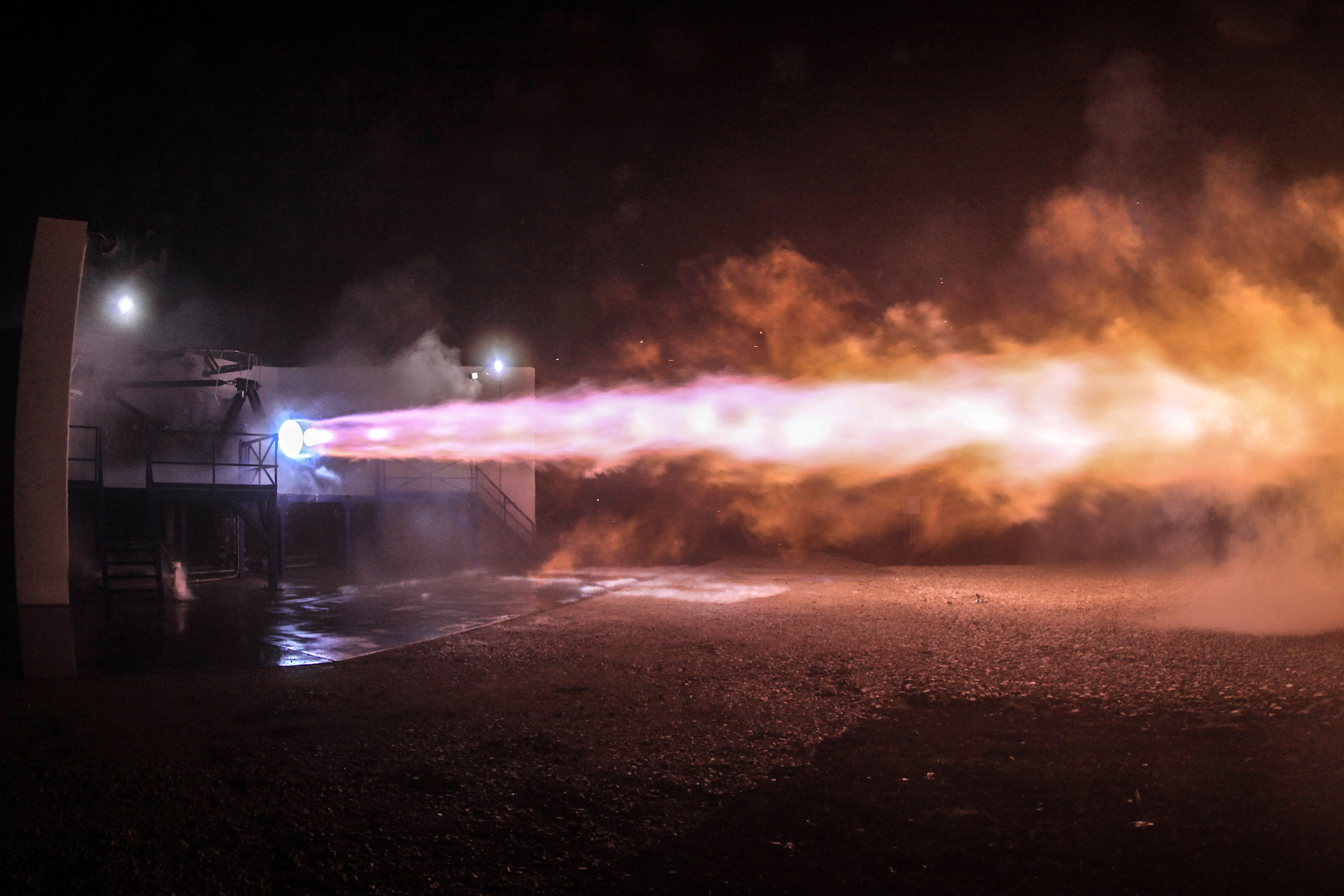
First test firing of a Raptor development engine on September 25, 2016, in McGregor, Texas

Raptor is a family of methane/liquid oxygen rocket engines under development by SpaceX since the late 2000s, although LH2/LOX propellant mix was originally under study when the Raptor concept development work began in 2009. When first mentioned by SpaceX in 2009, the term "Raptor" was applied exclusively to an upper stage engine concept. SpaceX discussed in October 2013 that they intended to build a family of methane-based Raptor rocket engines, initially announcing that the engine would achieve 2.94 meganewtons (661,000 lbf) vacuum thrust. In February 2014, they announced that the Raptor engine would be used on the Mars Colonial Transporter. The booster would utilize multiple Raptor engines, similar to the use of nine Merlin 1s on each Falcon 9 booster core. The following month, SpaceX confirmed that as of March 2014, all Raptor development work is exclusively on this single very large rocket engine, and that no smaller Raptor engines were in the current development mix.

The Raptor methane/LOX engine uses a highly efficient and theoretically more reliable full-flow staged combustion cycle, a departure from the open gas generator cycle system and LOX/kerosene propellants used on the current Merlin 1 engine series. As of February 2014, preliminary designs of Raptor were looking at producing 4.4 meganewtons (1,000,000 lbf) of thrust with a vacuum specific impulse (I_{sp}) of 363 seconds (3.56 km/s) and a sea-level I_{sp} of 321 seconds (3.15 km/s), although later concept sizes being looked at were closer to 2.2 MN (500,000 lbf).

Initial component-level testing of Raptor technology began in May 2014, with an injector element test. The first complete Raptor development engine, approximately one-third the size of the full-scale engines planned for the use on various parts of the Starship, with approximately 1,000 kN (220,000 lb_{f}) thrust, began testing on a ground test stand in September 2016. The test nozzle has an expansion ratio of only 150, in order to eliminate flow separation problems while tested in Earth's atmosphere.

Raptor's full-flow staged combustion cycle will pass 100 percent of the oxidizer (with a low-fuel ratio) to power the oxygen turbine pump, and 100 percent of the fuel (with a low-oxygen ratio) to power the methane turbine pump. Both streams—oxidizer and fuel—will be completely in the gas phase before they enter the combustion chamber. Prior to 2016, only two full-flow staged combustion rocket engines had ever progressed sufficiently to be tested on test stands: the Soviet RD-270 project in the 1960s and the Aerojet Rocketdyne Integrated powerhead demonstration project in the mid-2000s, which did not test a complete engine but rather only the powerhead.

Other characteristics of the full-flow design are projected to further increase performance or reliability, with the possibility to do design trade offs of one against the other:

- eliminating the fuel-oxidizer turbine interseal which is traditionally a point of failure in modern chemical rocket engines
- lower pressures are required through the pumping system, increasing life span and further reducing risk of catastrophic failure
- ability to increase the combustion chamber pressure, thereby either increasing overall performance, or "by using cooler gases, providing the same performance as a standard staged combustion engine but with much less stress on materials, thus significantly reducing material fatigue or [engine] weight."

=== Methox thruster ===
SpaceX is developing gaseous Methox thrusters that will utilize gas that needs to be vented from the propellant tanks to control attitude.

In his announcement of the Interplanetary Transport System (ITS) at the 67th International Astronautical Congress on September 27, 2016, Elon Musk indicated that all of the reaction control system thrusters for the ITS (subsequently renamed to Starship) would operate from the gaseous methane and oxygen supply in each of those vehicles, and that new thrusters would be developed for the purpose.

By 2020, one set of high‑thrust methox RCS thrusters were planned to be located mid‑body on the Starship HLS lunar-landing Starship variant and will be used during the final "tens of meters" of any terminal lunar descent and landing, as well as used for departing from the lunar surface. The mid-body design is specifically to address the problem of lunar surface erosion and the creation of Moon-wide dust from use of Raptor engines that are located at the base of Starship.

In 2021, hot gas thrusters were seen on the body of Starship prototypes, however it is unclear whether these will be used on future Starships.

== Hypergolic engines ==
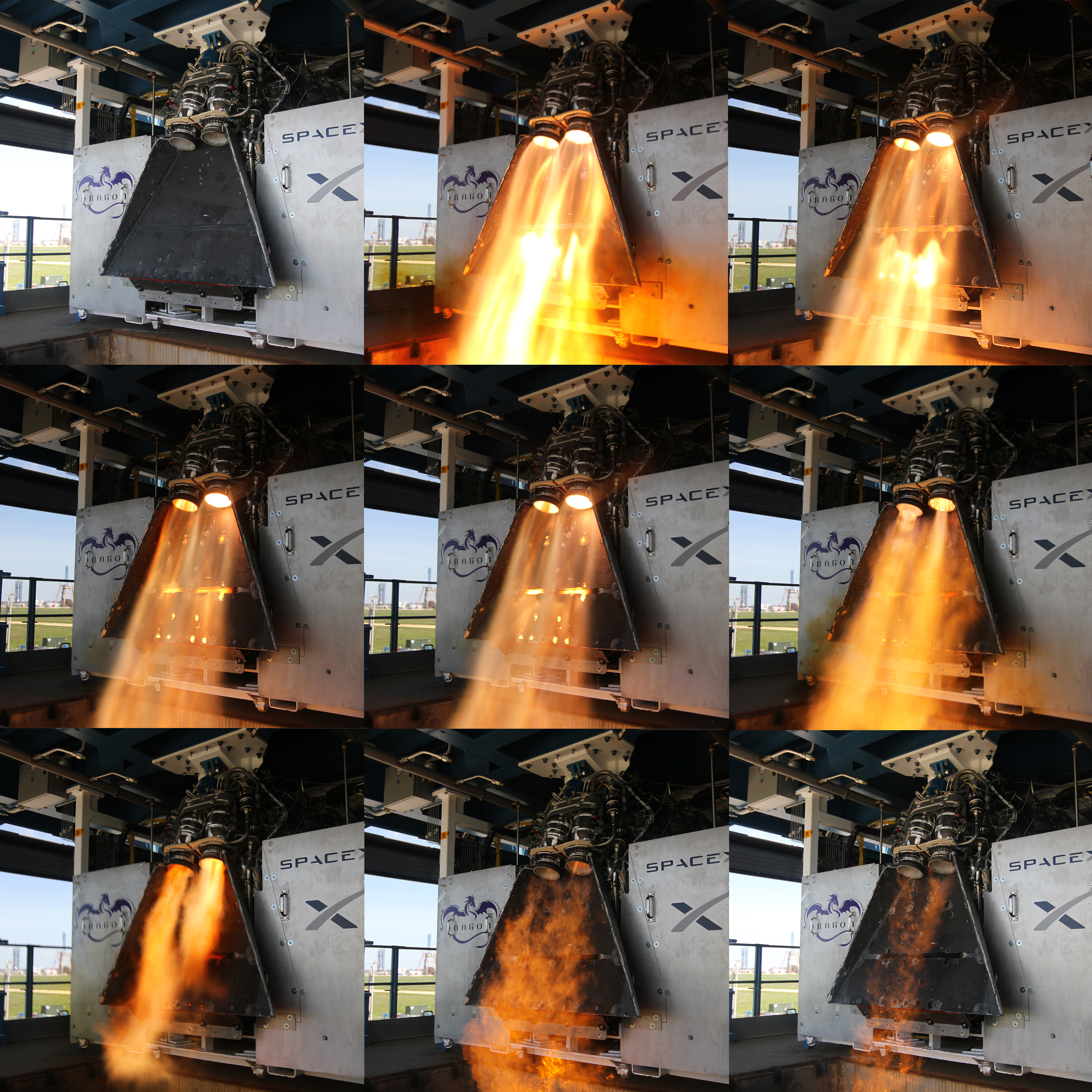
SuperDraco test-fire mosaic

=== Draco ===
Draco are hypergolic liquid-propellant rocket engines that utilize a mixture of monomethyl hydrazine fuel and nitrogen tetroxide oxidizer. Each Draco thruster generates 400 newtons (90 lbf) of thrust. They are used as Reaction Control System (RCS) thrusters on both the Dragon spacecraft, and on the Falcon 9 launch vehicle second-stage.

=== SuperDraco ===
SuperDraco storable-propellant hypergolic engines generate 67,000 newtons (15,000 lbf) of thrust, making the SuperDraco the third most powerful engine developed by SpaceX, more than 200 times more powerful than the regular Draco RCS thruster engines. By comparison, it is more than two times as powerful as the Kestrel engine used in SpaceX's Falcon 1 launch vehicle second stage, and about 1/9 the thrust of a Merlin 1D engine. They are used as Launch Abort System engines on the SpaceX Dragon 2 for crew transport to low Earth orbit.

== See also ==
- SpaceX launch vehicles
