= Merlin engine =

Merlin engine may refer to:

- Rolls-Royce Merlin, an aircraft engine
- Merlin (rocket engine family), family of rocket engines manufactured by SpaceX
- Merlin, a character in Thomas & Friends
