= Space Launch Initiative =

US NASA & DOD program 2000-2002

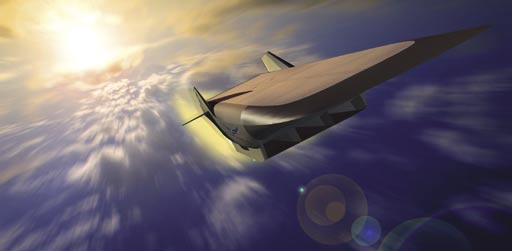
SLI art

The Space Launch Initiative (SLI) was a NASA and U.S. Department of Defense joint research and technology project to determine the requirements to meet all the nation's hypersonics, space launch and space technology needs. It was also known as the "2nd Generation Reusable Launch Vehicle (RLV) program.". The program began with the award of RLV study contracts in 2000.

The primary goal of the research was to increase safety and reliability and to reduce overall costs associated with building, flying and maintaining the nation's next generation of space launch vehicles. NASA anticipated that these advances would revitalize the nation's space transportation capabilities, and dramatically improve NASA's ability to conduct science and exploration missions in space. This program was evolved into the Orbital Space Plane Program and the Next Generation Launch Technology program in November 2002.

In 2004 NASA moved on to the Constellation Program, part of the Vision for Space Exploration, after the Columbia disaster.

== COBRA rocket engine ==
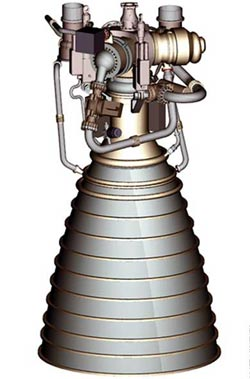
COBRA (Co-optimized Booster for Reusable Applications) rocket engine

"Co-optimized Booster for Reusable Applications".

== RS-83 rocket engine ==
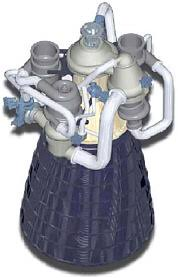
RS-83

The RS-83 was a rocket engine design for a reusable LH2/LOX rocket larger and more powerful than any other. The RS-83 was developed by Rocketdyne Propulsion and Power in Canoga Park, California to power the launch vehicle as part of the Space Launch Initiative program. This engine was designed to produce a thrust of 664,000 lbf (2,950 kN) at sea level and 750,000 lbf (3,300 kN) in a vacuum with an I_{sp} of 395 and 446 seconds (3.87 and 4.37 kN·s/kg), respectively.

The RS-83 is loosely based on the RS-68 that powers the Delta IV expendable launch vehicle. The RS-83 design is more efficient, lighter, slightly stronger, and yet reusable. The RS-83 was designed to last 100 missions, and was intended for use on the first stage of a two-stage-to-orbit reusable launch vehicle.

== RS-84 rocket engine ==
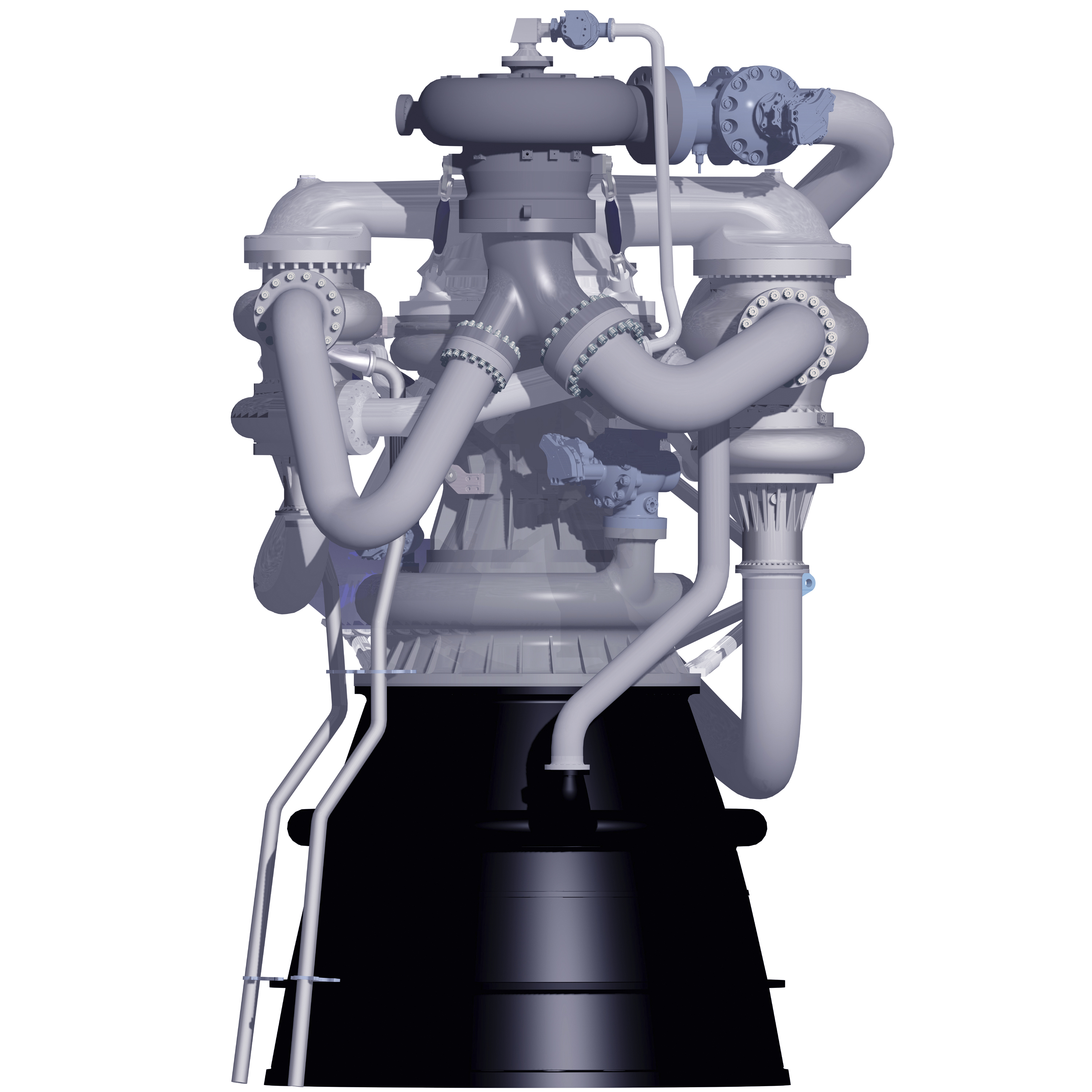
RS-84

As part of the Space Launch Initiative, Rocketdyne developed a plan for the RS-84 rocket engine. It would have been the first reusable, staged combustion cycle, liquid rocket engine produced by the US to use a hydrocarbon fuel. In contrast, the Soviet Union developed the RD-170 reusable staged combustion hydrocarbon engine for the Energia rocket in the 1980s.

The prototype engine would have 4,732 kN (1,064,000 lbf) at sea level; 5,026 kN (1,130,000 lbf) in vacuum; an 8-shift turn time; a specific impulse of 305 at sea level and 324 in vacuum.

NASA cancelled further development in 2005.

== TR-106 / TR-107 rocket engines ==
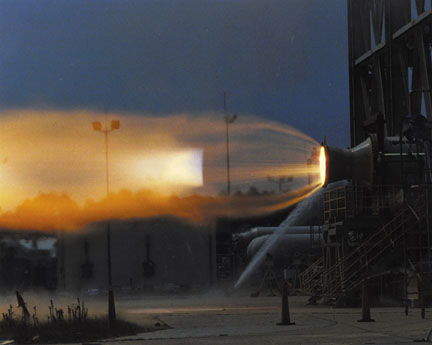
TR-106 rocket engine under test

The TR-106 or Low Cost Pintle Engine (LCPE) was a developmental LH2/LOX rocket engine designed by TRW under the Space Launch Initiative. It had a planned sea-level thrust of 650,000 lbf. It was tested at NASA John C. Stennis Space Center throughout 2000. The Stennis test stand results demonstrated that the engine was stable over a wide variety of thrust levels and propellant ratios. Development of the engine was temporarily discontinued with the cancellation of the Space Launch Initiative.

Since 2000, TRW has been acquired by Northrop Grumman and development of the TR-107 RP-1/LOX rocket engine began in 2001 for potential use on next-generation launch and space transportation vehicles is continuing under contract to NASA.

Technology lessons from the Low Cost Pintle Engine project assisted subcontractor development of engines by SpaceX. Tom Mueller was a lead engineer on the LCPE project, and later designed the Merlin engine for SpaceX.

== Air Force Reusable Booster Program ==
The Air Force Reusable Booster System program initiated in 2010, and cancelled in 2012, was hoped to renew interest in further development of these engines.

== See also ==
- List of space launch system designs
- TR-106 - Low Cost Pintle Engine (LPCE) using LOX/LH2 developed by TRW in 2000
- TR-107 - LOX/RP-1 engine developed in 2002
