= Pintle injector =

Propellant injection device for a rocket engine

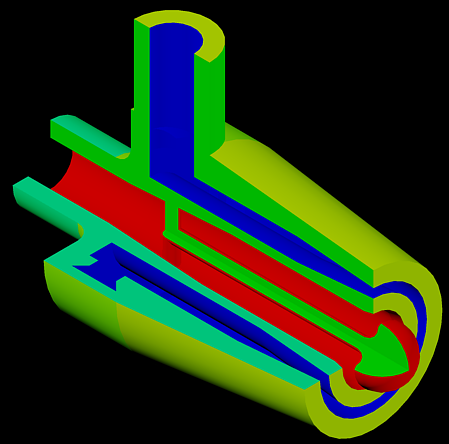
Fuel in red, oxidizer in blue

The pintle injector is a type of propellant injector for a bipropellant rocket engine. Like any other injector, its purpose is to ensure appropriate flow rate and intermixing–in this case, of propellants–as they are forcibly injected under high pressure into the combustion chamber, facilitating an efficient and controlled combustion process.

A pintle injector-based rocket engine provides greater throttling range than one based on a regular injector. Acoustic combustion instabilities are rare, because a pintle injector tends to create a self-stabilizing flow pattern. Thus, pintle-based engines are suitable specifically for applications requiring deep, fast, and safe throttling, such as with landers.

Pintle injectors began as early laboratory experimental apparatuses, used by Caltech's Jet Propulsion Laboratory in the mid-1950s, to study the mixing and combustion reaction times of hypergolic liquid propellants. The pintle injector was reduced to practice and, starting in 1960, developed by Space Technology Laboratories (STL) (At the time a division of Ramo-Wooldridge Corp., and later of TRW).

Pintle-based engines have been built to range from a few newtons of thrust up to several millions. The pintle design has been tested with both common and exotic propellant combinations, including gelled propellants. The first use of a pintle-based engine occurred during the Apollo Program in the Lunar Excursion Module's Descent Propulsion System on a crewed spacecraft. However, the design was not made public until October 24, 1972 when Gerard "Jerry" W. Elverum Jr. was granted the U.S. patent 3,699,772 for his coaxial pintle injector, applied for on January 8, 1968.

== Description ==
=== Working principle ===
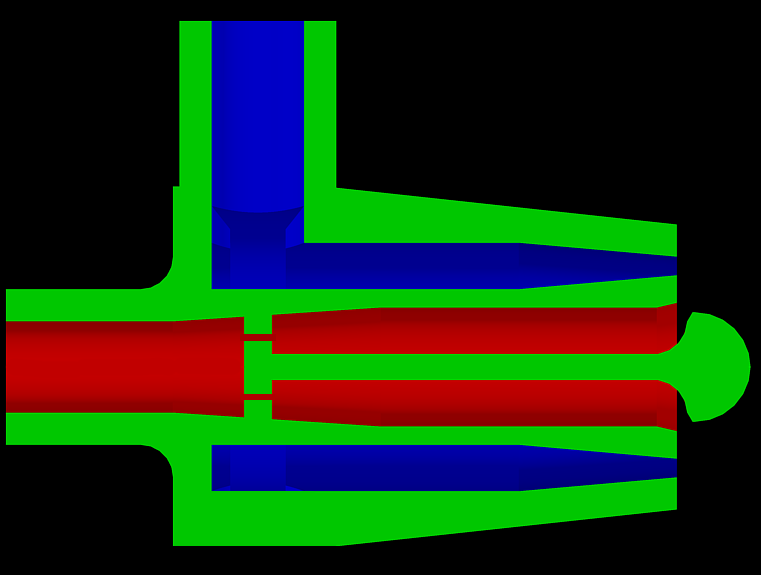
Another view, showing more clearly how fuel and oxidizer flow.

A pintle injector is a type of coaxial injector. It consists of two concentric tubes and a central protrusion. Propellant A (usually the oxidizer, represented with blue in the image) flows through an outer tube, exiting as a cylindrical stream, while propellant B (usually the fuel, represented with red in the image) flows within an inner tube and impinges on a central pintle-shaped protrusion (similar in shape to a poppet valve like those found on four-stroke engines), spraying out in a broad cone or a flat sheet that intersects the cylindrical stream of propellant A.

In the typical pintle-based engine design, only a single central injector is used, differing from "showerhead" injector plates that use multiple parallel injector ports.

Throttleability can be obtained either by placing valves before the injector, by moving the inner pintle or outer sleeve, or both.

Many people have experienced throttleable pintle sprayers in the form of standard garden hose-end sprayers.

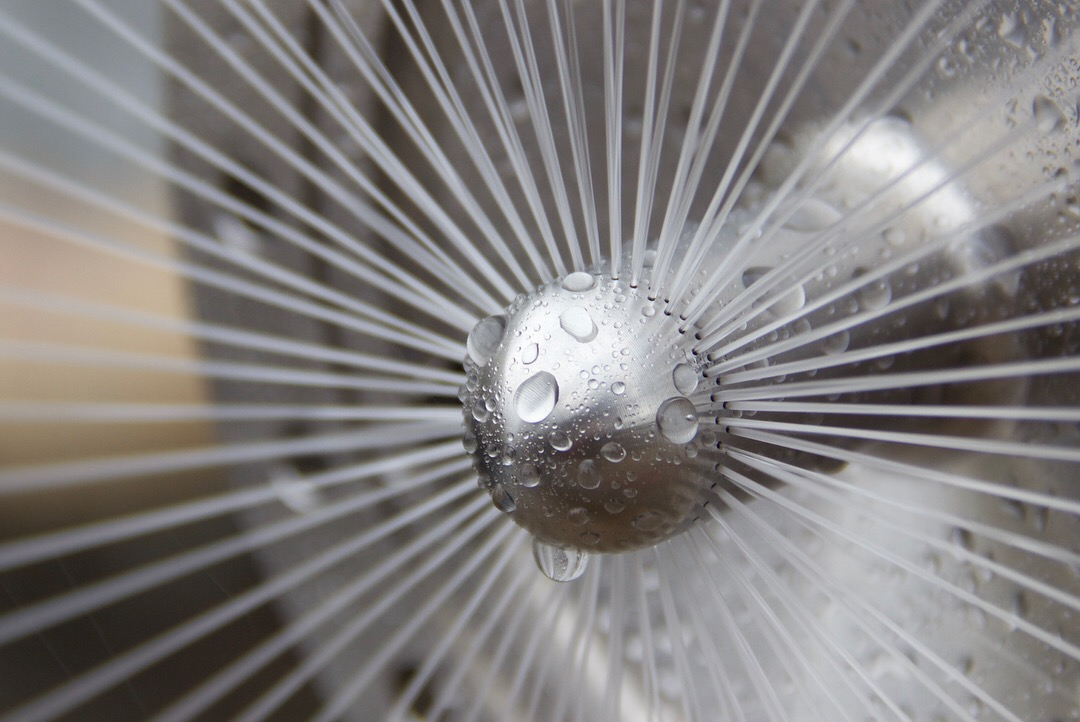
A pintle injector is shown during a cold flow test. The inner flow path is active.

=== Variants ===
In pintle engines that do not require throttling, the pintle is fixed in place, and propellant valves for startup and shutdown are placed elsewhere.

A movable pintle allows for throttleability, and, if the moving part is the sleeve, the pintle itself can act as the propellant valve. This is called a "Face Shutoff" pintle. A fast-moving sleeve allows for the engine to be operated in pulses, usually done in pintle-based RCS thrusters and missile divert thrusters.

In a Face Shutoff Only (FSO) pintle, a variant of the Face Shutoff pintle, the pintle itself is hydraulically actuated by the fuel through a pilot valve; no extra valves are required between the engine and tanks

In other variants, the pintle has cut grooves or orifices which produce radial jets in the flow of propellant B. This allows for extra unburned fuel to impinge on the walls of the combustion chamber, and provide fuel film cooling. The pintle pictured here is of this type.

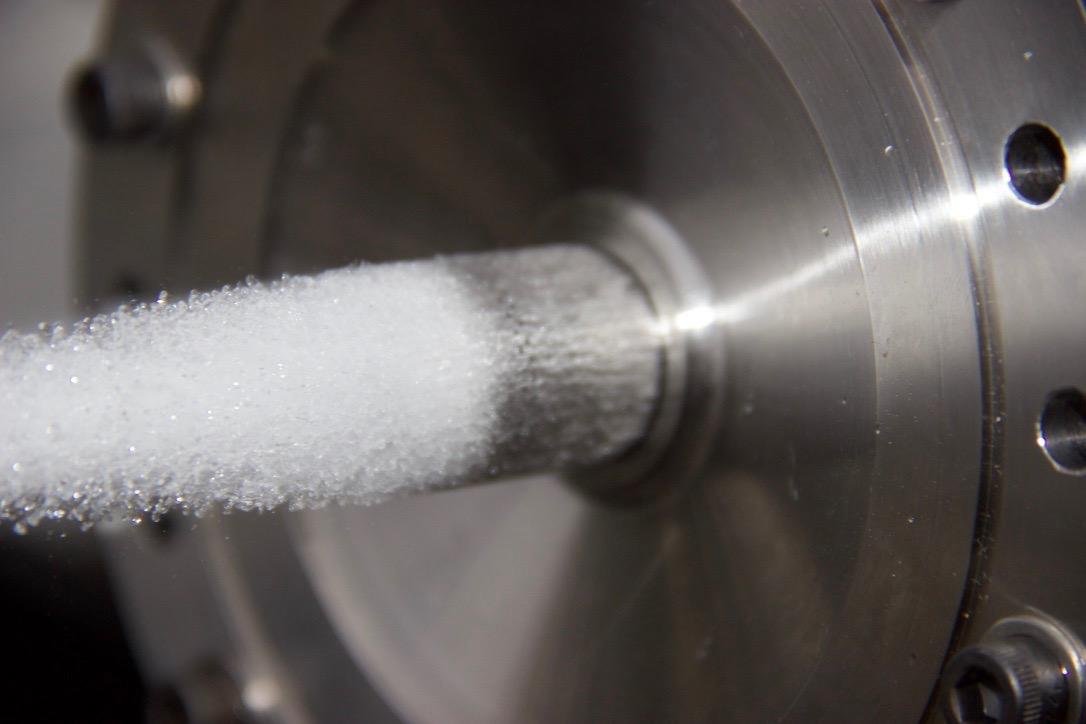
A pintle injector is shown during a cold flow test. The outer flow path is active.

== Advantages and disadvantages ==
=== Advantages ===
Compared to other injector designs, pintle injectors allow greater throttling of bipropellant flow rates, although throttling rocket engines in general remains difficult. If only one central injector is used, the mass flow inside the combustion chamber will have two main recirculation zones which decrease acoustic instability without necessarily requiring acoustic cavities or baffles.

The pintle injector design can deliver high combustion efficiency (typically 96–99%).

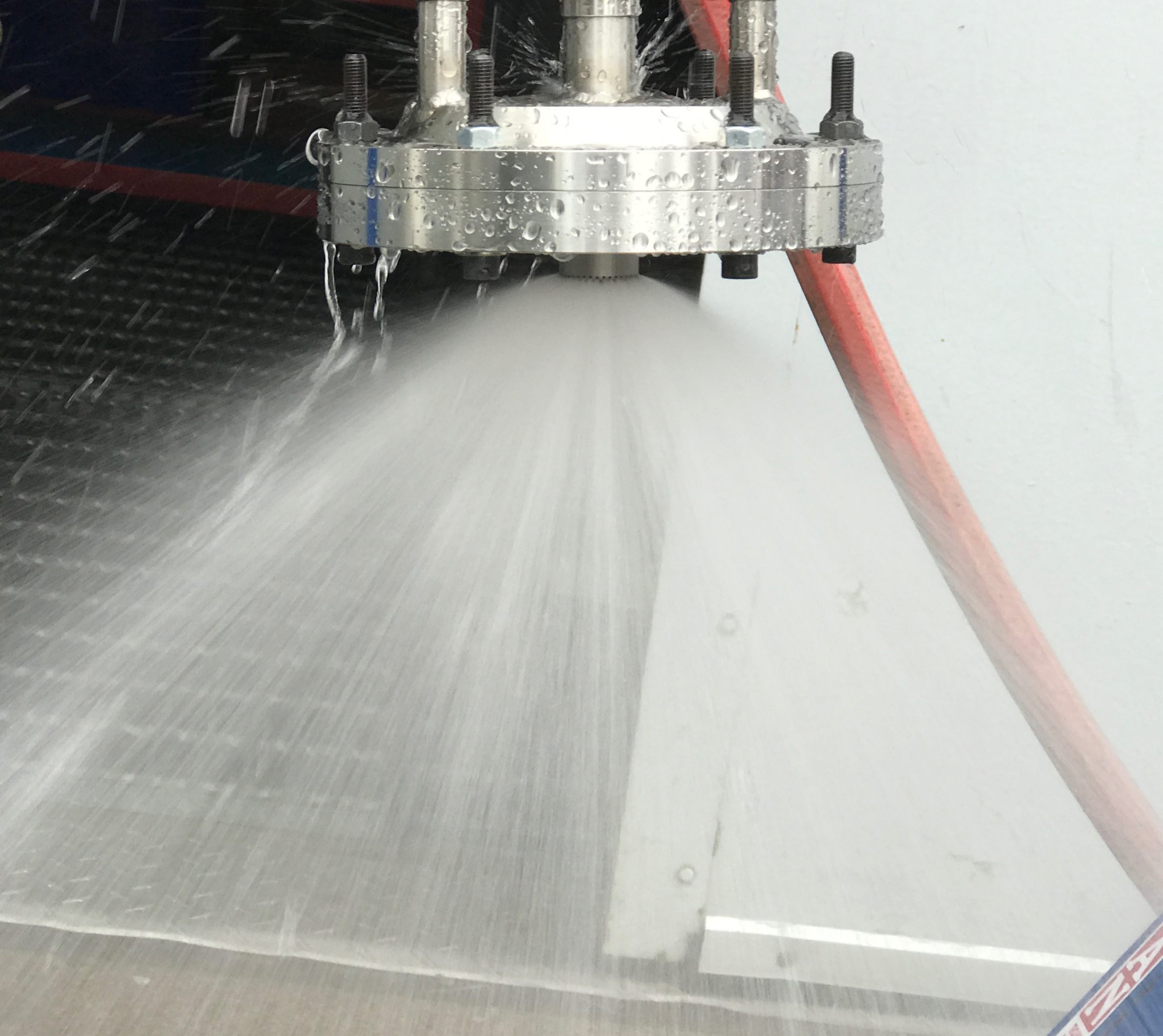
A pintle injector is shown during a cold flow test. Both flow paths are active.

If fuel is chosen for the inner flow (which is the case in most pintle-based engines), the injector can be tuned so that any excess fuel which is not reacted immediately as it passes through the oxidizer stream is projected onto the combustion chamber walls and cools them through evaporation, thus providing fuel film cooling to the combustion chamber walls, without incurring the mass penalty of a dedicated coolant subsystem.

While pintle injectors have been developed for applications in rocket propulsion, due to their relative simplicity, they could easily be adapted for industrial fluid handling processes requiring high flowrate and thorough mixing.

A given injector's performance can be easily optimized by varying the geometries of the outer propellant's annular gap and the central propellant slots (and/or continuous gap, if used). As this requires only two new pieces to be made, trying variations is usually cheaper and less time-consuming than with regular injectors.

=== Disadvantages ===
Because combustion tends to occur in the surface of a frustum, peak thermal stresses are localized on the combustion chamber wall rather than a more evenly distributed combustion across the chamber section and more even heating. This has to be contemplated when designing the cooling system, or it might cause burn-through.

The pintle injector is known to have caused throat-erosion problems in the early ablatively cooled Merlin engines due to uneven mixing causing hot streaks in the flow, however, as of 2021, it is not clear whether this is a problem that applies to all pintle-based engines, or this was a design problem of the Merlin.

Pintle injectors work very well with liquid propellants and can be made to work with gelled propellants, but for gas–liquid or gas–gas applications, conventional injectors remain superior in performance.

The pintle injector is desirable for engines that have to be throttled or restarted repeatedly, but it does not deliver optimal efficiency for fuel and oxidizer mixing at any given throttle rate.

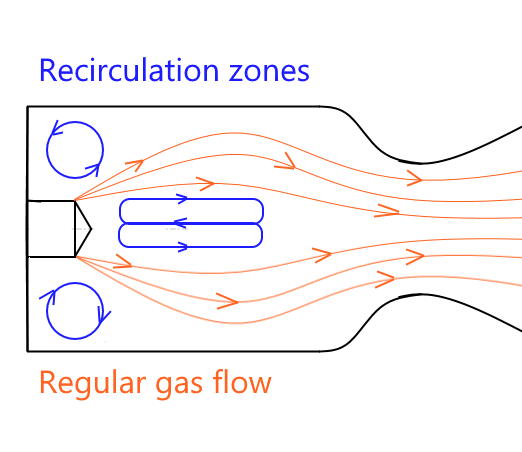
Recirculation zones for a single-injector engine

== History ==
=== 1950s ===
In 1957, Gerard W. Elverum Jr. was employed by the Jet Propulsion Laboratory, and working under the supervision of Art Grant to characterize the reaction rates of new rocket propellants by using a device consisting of two concentric tubes, through which propellants were fed at a known flowrate, and a set of thermocouples to measure their reaction rates. The device encountered problems, because as the propellants were flowing parallel to each other, not much mixing was happening. Elverum then placed a tip at the end of the innermost tube, attached to an internal support, which forced the inner propellant to flow outwards and mix with the outer propellant. This device worked fine for low energy propellants, but when high energy combinations started being tested, it proved impractical due to nearly instantaneous reaction times at the mixing point. In order to keep the device from blowing itself apart during high energy tests, the outer tube was retracted, thus constituting a primitive pintle injector.

Peter Staudhammer, under the supervision of Program Manager Elverum, had a technician cut multiple slots across the end of an available inner tube and subsequent tests of this new configuration showed a substantial improvement in mixing efficiency.

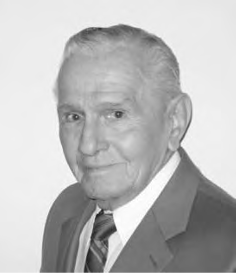
Pintle injector inventor, Gerard W. Elverum Jr.

=== 1960s ===
By 1960, Elverum, Grant, and Staudhammer had moved to the newly-formed Space Technology Laboratories, Inc. (Later TRW, Inc.) to pursue development of monopropellant and bipropellant rocket engines. By 1961, the pintle injector was developed into a design usable in rocket engines, and subsequently, the pintle injector design was matured and developed by a number of TRW employees, adding such features as throttling, rapid pulsing capability, and face shutoff.

Throttling was tested in the 1961 MIRA 500, at 25 to 500 lbf (111 to 2,224 N) and its 1962 successor, the MIRA 5000, at 250 to 5,000 lbf (1,112 to 22,241 N).

In 1963, TRW introduced the MIRA 150A as a backup for the Thiokol TD-339 vernier thruster to be used in the Surveyor probes, and started development of the Apollo Lunar Excursion Module's Descent Propulsion System. Near this time, a pintle injector was considered for simplicity and lower cost on the Sea Dragon.

In parallel with those projects, TRW continued development of other pintle engines, including by 1966 the URSA (Universal Rocket for Space Applications) series. These were bipropellant engines offered at fixed thrusts of 25, 100, or 200 lbf, (111, 445, or 890 N) with options for either ablative or radiatively cooled combustion chambers. These engines were capable of pulsing at 35 Hz, with pulse widths as small as .02 seconds, but also had design steady state firing life in excess of 10,000 seconds (with radiatively-cooled chambers).

In 1967 the Apollo Descent Propulsion System was qualified for flight.

From 1968 to 1970, a 250,000 lbf (1,112,055 N) engine was tested.

=== 1970s ===
In 1972 the Apollo Descent Propulsion System ended production, but starting in 1974, and continuing through 1988, the TR-201, a simplified, low cost derivative of it, featuring ablative cooling and fixed thrust, was used in the second stage of the Delta 2914 and 3914 launch vehicles.

In October 1972, the pintle injector design was patented and made public.

=== 1980s ===
In the early 1980s, a series of design refinements were applied to the pintle injector obtaining exceptionally fast and repeatable pulses on command and linear throttling capability. By enabling shutoff of propellants at their injection point into the combustion chamber, the pintle injector provided excellent pulse response by eliminating injector "dribble volume" effects.

Starting in 1981, a very compact, 8,200 lbf N_{2}O_{4}/MMH engine employing this feature was developed as a pitch and yaw thruster for the army's SENTRY missile program. This engine could throttle over a 19:1 thrust range and deliver repeatable "on" pulses as small as 8 milliseconds at any thrust level.

A further refinement of the face shutoff injector was used on the Army Strategic Defense Command's Exoatmospheric Reentry-vehicle Interceptor Subsystem (ERIS). In its 900 lbf lateral divert engines the injector shutoff element provided the only control of propellant flow. The large bipropellant valve normally required in such engines was replaced by a small pilot valve that used high pressure fuel (MMH) to hydraulically actuate the moveable injector sleeve. This feature, called FSO (Face Shutoff Only) greatly improved overall thruster response and significantly reduced engine size and mass.

Another design challenge from the mid 1980s and early 1990s was that of obtaining miniaturization of rocket engines. As part of the Air Force Brilliant Pebbles program, TRW developed a very small 5 lbf (22 N) N_{2}O_{4}/hydrazine thruster using a pintle injector. This radiatively-cooled engine weighed 0.3 lb (135 grams) and was successfully tested in August 1993, delivering over 300 seconds I_{sp} with a 150:1 nozzle expansion ratio. The pintle diameter was (1.6764 mm) and scanning electron microscopy was needed to verify the dimensions on the ± (0.0762 mm ±0.00762 mm) radial metering orifices.

=== 1990s ===
The preceding technology innovations enabled the first exoatmospheric kinetic kill of a simulated reentry warhead off Kwajalein atoll on 28 January 1991 on the first flight of ERIS.

In the late '90s, FSO pintle injectors were used with gelled propellants, which have a normal consistency like that of smooth peanut butter. Gelled propellants typically use either aluminum powder or carbon powder to increase the energy density of the liquid fuel base (typically MMH) and they use additives to rheologically match the oxidizer (typically IRFNA based) to the fuel. For gelled propellants to be used on a rocket, face shutoff is mandatory to prevent dry-out of the base liquid during off times between pulses, which would otherwise result in the solids within the gels plugging the injector passages. FSO pintle injectors were used on a variety of programs, the McDonnell Douglas Advanced Crew Escape Seat – Experimental (ACES-X) program and its successor, the Gel Escape System Propulsion (GESP) program.

Another major design adaptation in this time period was the use of pintle injectors with cryogenic liquid hydrogen fuel. Beginning in 1991, TRW joined with McDonnell Douglas and NASA Lewis (now Glenn) Research Center to demonstrate that TRW's pintle engine could use direct injection of liquid hydrogen to simplify the design of high-performance booster engines. Attempts to use direct injection of cryogenic hydrogen in other types of injectors had until then consistently resulted in the onset of combustion instabilities.

In late 1991 and early 1992, a 16,000 lbf (71,172 N) LOX/LH2 test engine was successfully operated with direct injection of liquid hydrogen and liquid oxygen propellants. A total of 67 firings were conducted, and the engine demonstrated excellent performance and total absence of combustion instabilities. Subsequently, this same test engine was adapted for and was successfully tested with LOX/LH2 at 40,000 lbf (177,929 N) and with LOX/RP-1 at 13,000 and 40,000 lbf. (57,827 and 177,929 N).

At the same time, TR-306 liquid apogee engines were used on the Anik E-1/E-2 and Intelsat K spacecraft.

In August 1999 the dual mode TR-308 was used to place NASA's Chandra spacecraft on its final orbit.

The early FSO injector and gel propellant development work of the late 1980s and early 1990s led to the world's first missile flights using gelled oxidizer and gelled fuel propellants on the Army's/AMCOM's Future Missile Technology Integration (FMTI) program, with the first flight in March 1999 and the second flight in May 2000.

=== 2000s ===
In the early 2000s TRW continued development of large LOX/LH2 pintle engines, and test-fired the TR-106 at NASA's John C. Stennis Space Center. This was a 650,000 lbf (2,892,000 N) engine, a 16:1 scale-up from the largest previous LOX/LH2 pintle engine and about a 3:1 scale-up from the largest previous pintle engine ever tested. This injector's pintle diameter was 22 inches (56 cm), by far the largest built to date.

In 2002 the larger TR-107 was designed.

Tom Mueller, who had worked on the TR-106 and TR-107, was hired by SpaceX and started development of the Merlin and Kestrel engines.

=== 2010s ===
The Merlin engine was the only pintle injector engine in operation, used for all SpaceX Falcon 9 and Falcon Heavy flights.

=== 2020s ===
In the early 2020s, the Merlin engine continued to be used on the Falcon 9 and Falcon Heavy. The pintle injector was also used on the Reaver 1 engine by Firefly Aerospace.

== Engines known to use pintle injectors ==
Name	Manufacturer	Fuel	Oxidizer	Thrust, N	Thrust, lbf
AC/LAE	TRW Inc.	Hydrazine	N_{2}O_{4}	534	120
Apollo Common RCS Engine	TRW Inc.	MMH	N_{2}O_{4}	445	100
Boomie Zoomie	Purdue SEDS	Liquid Methane	LOX	2,384	536
Boomie Zoomie B (BZB)	Purdue SEDS	Liquid Methane	LOX	4,003	900
Descent Propulsion System	TRW Inc.	Aerozine 50	N_{2}O_{4}	45,040	10,125
DLX-150B Firebolt	Delft Aerospace Rocket Engineering	Ethanol 80%, water 20%	LOX	9,000	2,000
DM/LAE	TRW Inc.	Hydrazine	N_{2}O_{4}	467	105
ERIS Divert Thruster	TRW Inc.	MMH	N_{2}O_{4}	4,048	910
Executor	ARCA	Kerosene	LOX	260,000	57,300
E-1 Lightbulb	Space Enterprise at Berkeley	Propane or Methane	LOX	2700	605
FMTI	TRW Inc.	Gelled MMH with carbon additive	Gelled IRFNA (Inhibited red fuming nitric acid)		
ISPS	TRW Inc.	USO (UDMH + 0.9% Silicone oil)	HDA (Type 4 high density red fuming nitric acid)	445	100
Janus	ERAU Rocket Development Lab	Kerosene	LOX	4,448	1000
Kestrel	SpaceX	RP-1	LOX	31,000	6,900
KEW 10.2 Divert Thruster	TRW Inc.	MMH	N_{2}O_{4}	1,334	300
Lunar Hopper Engine	TRW Inc.	MMH	MON-10	800	180
Merlin	SpaceX	RP-1	LOX	Several variants, see main article for details.	Several variants, see main article for details.
Mira 1	Oregon State HALE	Jet-A	LOX	6,005	1,350
Mira 2	Oregon State HALE	Jet-A	LOX	7,717	1,600
MIRA 150A	TRW Inc.	MMH	MON-10	667	150
MIRA 500	TRW Inc.	Aerozine 50 or Hydrazine	N_{2}O_{4}	2,224	500
MIRA 5000	TRW Inc.	Aerozine 50 or UDMH	N_{2}O_{4} or RFNA	22,241	5,000
MMBPS	TRW Inc.	MMH	N_{2}O_{4}	391	88
Morpheus	Purdue University	Methane	LOX	5,783-18,683	1,300-4,200
Reaver 1	Firefly Aerospace	RP-1	LOX	36,800	82,750
SENTRY Jet Interaction Pitch and Yaw Thruster	TRW Inc.	MMH	N_{2}O_{4}	36,475	8,200
THANOS-A	Imperial College London Rocketry	Methanol	N_{2}O	3000	674
THANOS-R	Imperial College London Rocketry	Methanol	N_{2}O	4000	899
THANOS-R2	Imperial College London Rocketry	Ethanol	N_{2}O	6000	1349
TR-106	TRW Inc.	LH2	LOX	2,892,000	650,000
TR-107	TRW Inc./Northrop Grumman	RP-1	LOX	4,900,000	1,100,000
TR-201	TRW Inc.	Aerozine 50	N_{2}O_{4}	4,900	9,419
TR-306	TRW Inc.	Hydrazine	N_{2}O_{4}		
TR-308	TRW Inc.	Hydrazine	N_{2}O_{4}		
TR-312	TRW Inc.	Hydrazine or MMH	N_{2}O_{4}		
URSA 25 R	TRW Inc.	Aerozine 50 or MMH	N_{2}O_{4}	111	25
URSA 100 R	TRW Inc.	Aerozine 50 or MMH	N_{2}O_{4}	445	100
URSA 200 R	TRW Inc.	Aerozine 50 or MMH	N_{2}O_{4}	890	200
Valkyrie	KXR UCF	Ethanol	N_{2}O	890	200
Welkin	Galactic Energy	RP-1	LOX	500,000	110,000
YJ-1S	Yellow Jacket Space Program (YJSP)	Jet-A	LOX	3,336	750
Anathema	San Diego State University Rocket Project (SDSU RP)	Ethanol	LOX	4,448	1000
COSMOS	Interstellar Technologies Inc.	LCH4	LOX	130,000	29226
Elysium 1.1	Texas A&M Rocket Engine Design (RED)	Ethanol 95%, Water 5%	N_{2}O	2,277.50	512
