= Falcon X =

Proposed spaceflight launch system

- Function: Re-usable orbital launch vehicle
- Manufacturer: SpaceX
- Country of origin: United States

Size
- Height: 55 m (180 ft)
- Diameter: 6.0 m (19.7 ft)
- Stages: 2

Capacity
- Payload to LEO: Normal: 38,000 kg (84,000 lb) Heavy:125,000 kg (276,000 lb)

Launch history
- Status: Proposed

Boosters (Falcon X Heavy)
- No. boosters: 2
- Engines: 3 x Merlin 2
- Thrust: 3,600,000 lb_{f} (16,000 kN)(sl)
- Specific impulse: Sea level: 285 sec (- kN/kg); Vacuum: 321 sec (- kN/kg)
- Burn time: Unknown
- Propellant: LOX/RP-1

First stage
- Engines: 3 x Merlin 2
- Thrust: 3,600,000 lb_{f} (16,000 kN)(sl)
- Propellant: LOX/RP-1

Second stage
- Engines: 1 Raptor
- Thrust: 150,000 lb_{f} (670 kN)
- Specific impulse: Vacuum: 470.1 sec (- kN/kg)
- Burn time: 345 seconds
- Propellant: LOX/LH2

Falcon X was a proposed spaceflight launch system that uses rockets designed and manufactured by SpaceX. Like the Falcon 1 and Falcon 9 the first stage of this two-stage-to-orbit vehicle would have used liquid oxygen (LOX) and rocket-grade kerosene (RP-1) propellants and was intended to be reusable. The second stage would use liquid oxygen (LOX) and liquid hydrogen (LH2) and be powered by the Raptor engine.

Multiple variants were planned with payloads to low Earth orbit of up to 38,000 kilograms (84,000 lb) for the basic version and up to 125,000 kilograms (276,000 lb) for the 3 core heavy, placing the Falcon X design in the heavy-lift to super heavy-lift range of launch systems.

== Design ==
The proposed base Falcon X would have been a two-stage, LOX/RP-1, LOX/LH2, fueled launch vehicle. Its first stage would be powered by 3 SpaceX Merlin 2 rocket engines with 5.3 MN (1.2M lbf) sea-level thrust per engine for a total thrust on liftoff of approximately 16 MN (3.6 million lbf). The Falcon X first stage would likely of used a pyrophoric mixture of triethylaluminum-triethylborane (TEA-TEB) as a first-stage ignitor, as does the Falcon 9.

The cancelled Falcon X Heavy configuration consists of a standard Falcon X with two additional Falcon X first stages acting as liquid strap-on boosters, which is conceptually similar to EELV launchers such as the Delta IV Heavy and the future Atlas V HLV, and also to the Russian Angara carrier rocket.

The upper stage would be powered by a single Raptor engine which would use LOX/LH2, with an expansion ratio of 250:1 and throttle range of 50-100%. For added reliability of restart, the engine has dual redundant pyrophoric igniters (TEA-TEB). SpaceX had expressed hopes that both stages will eventually be reusable.

The interstage, which would have connected the upper and lower stage for Falcon X, would be a carbon fiber aluminum core composite structure, scaling up designs used for the Falcon 1 and Falcon 9. Stage separation would occur via reusable separation collets and a pneumatic pusher system. The Falcon X tank walls and domes would be made from aluminum lithium alloy. SpaceX uses an all friction stir welded tank, the highest strength and most reliable welding technique available. The second stage tank of Falcon X is simply a shorter version of the first stage tank and uses most of the same tooling, material and manufacturing techniques, however using a different engine. This results in significant cost savings in vehicle production.

As with the company's smaller Falcon 1 and Falcon 9, the Falcon X launch sequence would have included a hold-down feature that allows full engine ignition and systems check before liftoff. After first stage engine start, the launcher would be held down and not released for flight until all propulsion and vehicle systems are confirmed to be operating normally. An automatic safe shut-down and unloading of propellant occurs if any abnormal conditions are detected.

Falcon X will have triple redundant flight computers and inertial navigation, with a GPS overlay for additional orbit insertion accuracy.

== Launch sites ==
Musk has expressed the opinion that NASA would be advised to retain SLC-39 for use by vehicles such as this.

== Launcher versions ==
| Version | Falcon X | Falcon X Heavy |
|---|---|---|
| Stage 0 | — | 2 boosters with 3 × Merlin 2 each |
| Stage 1 | 3 × Merlin 2 | 3 × Merlin 2 |
| Stage 2 | 1 × Raptor | 1 × Raptor |
| Height (max; m) | ~55 (large fairing) | ~55 (large fairing) |
| Diameter (m) | 8 | 8 (large fairing) |
| Initial thrust (lb-f) | 3.6M | 10.8M |
| Takeoff weight (tonnes) | 325 | 885 |
| Fairing diameter (Inner; m) | 6 | 6 |
| Payload (LEO; lb) | 38,000 | 125,000 |
| Success ratio (successful/total) | - | - |

== Initial descriptions ==
At an appearance in May 2004 before the U.S. Senate Committee on Commerce, Science and Transportation, Elon Musk testified, "Long term plans call for development of a heavy lift product and even a super-heavy, if there is customer demand. [...] Ultimately, I believe $500 per pound [of payload delivered to orbit] or less is very achievable."

SpaceX formally announced the Falcon X on July 28, 2010. A Falcon X medium was described as being capable of launching approximately 38,000 lb (17,000 kg) to low Earth orbit.

== See also ==
- Kestrel
- Merlin
- Raptor
- Falcon 1
- Falcon 5
- Falcon 9
- Falcon XX
