= TR-106 =

US experimental low-cost hydrolox pintle injector rocket engine

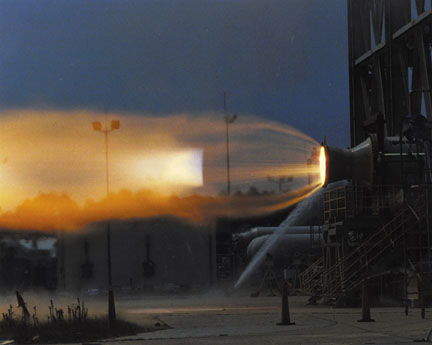
- A TRW 650K low-cost pintle engine undergoes hot-fire testing at SSC's E-1 test stand.
- Country of origin: United States
- Manufacturer: TRW
- Application: low-cost throttleable booster engine

Liquid-fuel engine
- Propellant: Liquid oxygen / LH2 (liquid hydrogen)

Performance
- Thrust, sea-level: 2,892 kN (650,000 lbf)

The TR-106 or low-cost pintle engine (LCPE) was a developmental rocket engine designed by TRW under the Space Launch Initiative to reduce the cost of launch services and space flight.

Operating on LOX/LH2, the engine had a thrust of 2892 kN, or 650,000 pounds, making it one of the most powerful engines ever constructed.

== Overview ==
The goal of the development was to produce a large, low-cost, easy-to-manufacture booster engine. The design used a single element coaxial pintle injector, a robust type of injector. It also used ablative cooling of the combustion chamber and nozzle instead of the more costly to manufacture regenerative cooling.

The use of the pintle injector allows the engine thrust to be widely throttleable, as was the case for the lunar module descent engine.

== Status ==
Tom Mueller was a lead engineer for development of the LCPE, a 650,000 lbf thrust LOX/LH2 engine. In the summer of 2000, this LCPE was successfully hot fire tested at 100 percent of its rated thrust as well as at a 65 percent throttle condition at NASA's John C. Stennis Space Center in Mississippi. TRW changed the pintle injector configuration three times during testing to explore the engine's performance envelope; engineers also replaced the ablative chamber once while the engine was on the test stand—demonstrating the LCPE's ease of operation. Test results demonstrated that the engine was stable over a wide variety of thrust levels and propellant ratios.

Development of the engine was temporarily discontinued with the cancellation of the Space Launch Initiative. In 2002 TRW was acquired by Northrop Grumman and development of a LOX/RP-1 engine (TR-107) continued, under contract to NASA, for potential use on next-generation launch and space transportation vehicles.

== Legacy ==
Tom Mueller became TRW vice president of propulsion. In 2002, Elon Musk asked Mueller to join him as a founding member of SpaceX.

Technology lessons from the Low Cost Pintle Engine project were used in the development of the SpaceX Merlin engine. Mueller joined SpaceX in 2002, becoming its head of propulsion, along with other TRW staffers. The turbopump, meanwhile, was contracted to Barber-Nichols, Inc., which derived their pump from their work on the FASTRAC turbopump. After SpaceX accused Northrop Grumman, TRW's parent, of letting engineers supervising SpaceX under a Pentagon contract use that information on Northrop's own rocket technology, Northrop Grumman then sued for theft of trade secrets. The dueling suits were settled in early 2005.

== See also ==
- Raptor
