= MVAC =

MVAC can refer to:

- Anti-Communist Volunteer Militia
- MVAC chemotherapy regimen of (methotrexate, vinblastine, adriamycin and cisplatin)
- MVAC mechanical ventilation and air conditioning
- MVAC Motor Vehicle Asset Communicator
- MVac Merlin Vacuum (rocket engine)
  - Merlin 1C Vacuum
  - Merlin 1D Vacuum
- MVAC Moscow Vascular Anomalies Clinic mvac.ru
