= Next Generation Launch Technology =

Next Generation Launch Technology (NGLT) was a NASA Program Office established in 2002, to pursue technologies for future space launch systems.

In 2004, NASA moved on to the Constellation Program, part of the Vision for Space Exploration.

== Objectives (2002) ==
"To pursue technologies for future space launch systems. NGLT will fund research in key technology areas such as propulsion, launch vehicles, operations and system analyses. NGLT is part of NASA's Integrated Space Technology Plan. The NGLT Program is sponsored by NASA's Office of Aerospace Technology and is part of the Space Launch Initiative theme that includes both NGLT and Orbital Space Plane. NGLT will focus on technology development to increase safety and reliability and reduce overall costs associated with building, flying and maintaining the nation's next-generations of space launch vehicles."

== NGLT projects ==
NGLT covered : propulsion technology, launch systems (vehicle related technologies), and system analyses and engineering.

Propulsion projects included :

- Rocket Engine Prototype Project: focusing on a 1+ MLbs LOX/Hydrocarbon booster engine
- Rocket Based Combined Cycle (RBCC) Project: focusing on a rocket-based airbreathing engines for ground testing from Mach 0 to 7
- Turbine Based Combined Cycle (TBCC) Project: focusing on a turbine based airbreathing engines for ground testing up to Mach 4+
- Integrated Powerhead Demonstrator (IPD): testing a 250 Klb thrust oxygen/hydrogen full flow stage combustion engine
