= Fastrac (rocket engine) =

NASA low cost rocket engine design

Fastrac MC-1
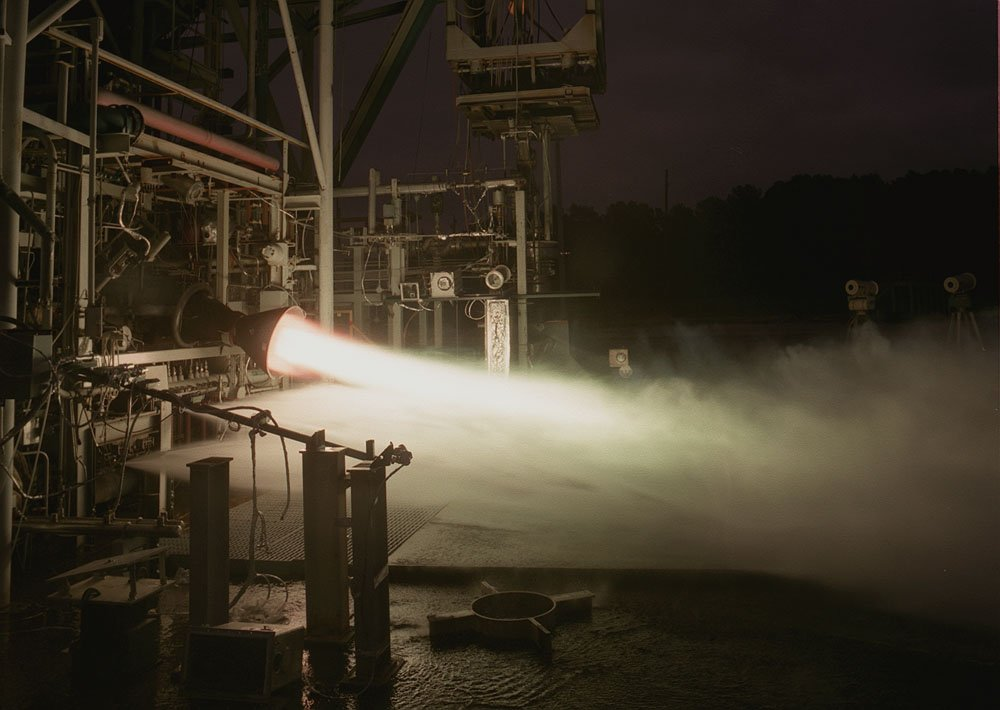
- Fastrac engine during test at Marshall Space Flight Center test stand 116
- Country of origin: United States
- Manufacturer: NASA
- Application: Low Cost Booster Technology, X-34

Liquid-fuel engine
- Propellant: LOX / RP-1 (rocket grade kerosene)
- Cycle: gas-generator

Performance
- Thrust, vacuum: 60,000 lbf (270 kN)
- Specific impulse, vacuum: 314 s (3.0 km/s)

Dimensions
- Length: 2.13 m (7 ft 0 in)
- Diameter: 1.22 m (4 ft 0 in)
- Dry mass: less than 910 kg (2,010 lb)

Fastrac was a turbo pump-fed, liquid rocket engine. The engine was designed by NASA as part of the low cost X-34 Reusable Launch Vehicle (RLV) and as part of the Low Cost Booster Technology (LCBT, a.k.a. Bantam) project. This engine was later known as the MC-1 engine when it was merged into the X-34 project.

== Design ==
The turbopump engine was designed to be used in an expendable booster in the LCBT project. As a result this led to the use of composite materials because of their significantly lower costs and production speed; this also reduced engine complexity since the fuel was not used for nozzle cooling. Based on knowledge and experience from the Space Shuttle's Reusable Solid Rocket Motor (RSRM) and the Solid Propulsion Integrity Program (SPIP), a Silica/phenolic material was chosen for the ablative liner with carbon/epoxy structural overlap.

The engine used liquid oxygen as an oxidizer and kerosene (RP-1) as a fuel. These propellants are used by the F-1 rocket engine on the Saturn V. Kerosene does not have the same energy release as hydrogen, used with the Space Shuttle, but it is cheaper and easier to handle and store. Propellants were fed via a single shaft, dual impeller LOX/RP-1 turbo-pump.

The engine was started with a TEA/TEB hypergolic igniter to maintain a simple design. Kerosene was injected and the engine was then running. The propellants were then fed into the gas generator for mixing and thrust chamber for burning.

The engine uses a gas generator cycle to drive the turbo-pump turbine, which then exhausts this small amount of spent fuel. This is the identical cycle used with the Saturn rockets, but much less complex than the Space Shuttle engine system.

The engine used an inexpensive, expendable, ablatively cooled carbon fiber composite nozzle and produced 60,000 lbf (285 kN) of thrust. After use nearly all of the engine's parts are reusable.

During the research phase in 1999 each Fastrac engine was costed at approximately $1.2 million. Production costs were expected to drop to $350,000 per engine.

== History ==
Engine system level testing started in 1999 at the Stennis Space Center. Earlier tests were on individual components at the Marshall Space Flight Center. NASA started full-engine, hot-fire testing in March, 1999, with a 20 second test to demonstrate the complete engine system. The engine was tested at full power for 155 seconds on July 1, 1999. A total of 85 tests were scheduled for the rest of 1999. As of 2000, 48 tests had been conducted on three engines using three test stands.

The first engine was installed on the X-34 A1 vehicle that was unveiled at NASA's Dryden Flight Research Center on April 30, 1999.

The Fastrac program was cancelled in 2001. After FASTRAC, NASA tried to salvage this design for use in other rockets such as Rotary Rocket's Roton and Orbital's X-34 project. The designation of the rocket engine was changed from the Fastrac 60K to Marshall Center - 1 (MC-1). The MC-1 project was closed by July, 2009, after the X-34 project was terminated in March, 2009.

== Components ==
NASA collaborated with industry partners to meet the principal objective to use commercial, off-the-shelf components. Industry partners included Summa Technology Inc., Allied Signal Inc., Marotta Scientific Controls Inc., Barber-Nichols Inc., and Thiokol Propulsion.

== Legacy ==
A similar set of technical solutions that reduce the cost of the engine was implemented in the SpaceX's Merlin 1A engine, which used a turbopump from the same subcontractor. The Merlin-1A was somewhat larger with a thrust of 77,000 lbf (340 kN) versus 60,000 lbf (270 kN) for Fastrac. The same basic design was capable of much higher thrust levels after upgrading the turbopump. Variants of the Merlin-1D achieve 190,000 lbf (850 kN) of thrust as of May, 2018, though the combustion chamber is now regeneratively cooled.

== Specifications ==
- Vacuum thrust: 60,000 lbf (270 kN)
- Vacuum specific impulse: 314 s (3.0 kN·s/kg)
- Chamber pressure: 633 psi (4.36 MPa; 43.6 bar)
- Total mass flow: 91.90 kg/s
- Gas generator pressure: 39.64 bar (3.964 MPa; 574.9 psi)
- Gas generator temperature: 888.89 K
- Throat diameter: 0.22 m
- Fuel: RP-1 (rocket grade kerosene)
- Oxidizer: Liquid oxygen

== See also ==
- Merlin (rocket engine) SpaceX booster engine
- Kestrel (rocket engine) SpaceX small upper stage engine for Falcon-1
- RS-88 another engine developed for Bantam project
- Executor (rocket engine)
