= TR-107 =

Proposed US kerolox rocket engine

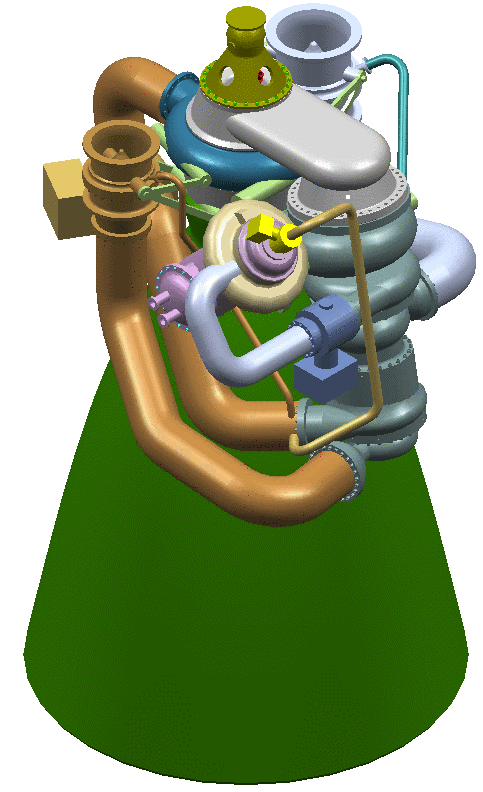
- Country of origin: United States
- Manufacturer: Northrop Grumman
- Application: low cost throttleable booster engine

Liquid-fuel engine
- Propellant: LOX / RP-1 (kerosene)

Performance
- Thrust, sea-level: 4,900 kN (1,100,000 lbf)
- Chamber pressure: 177 bar

Dimensions
- Dry mass: 00 kg (0 lb)

The TR-107 was a developmental rocket engine designed in 2002 by Northrop Grumman for the NASA and DoD-funded Space Launch Initiative (SLI). Operating on LOX/RP-1, the engine was throttleable and had a thrust of 4,900 kN (1,100,000 lbf) at a chamber pressure of 17.7 megapascals (177 bar), making it one of the most powerful engines ever constructed.

== History ==
The TR-107 was developed by TRW following the successful conclusion of the development program for the TR-106 engine, a similar throttleable engine of about half the thrust burning LOX/LH2 instead of LOX / RP-1. Tom Mueller, then VP of Propulsion Development at Northrop, was project manager for both the TR-106 and TR-107 engines.

In 2002, Mueller co-founded SpaceX with Elon Musk and became the VP of propulsion after cancellation of the SLI program.

== Status ==
Northrop Grumman development of the TR-107 engine permitted consideration for potential use on next-generation launch and space transportation systems.

As of 2023, no flight models are known to exist.

== See also ==
- Rocketdyne F-1
- SpaceX Merlin
- SpaceX Raptor
