= Orbital Sciences X-34 =

Hypersonic research plane

X-34
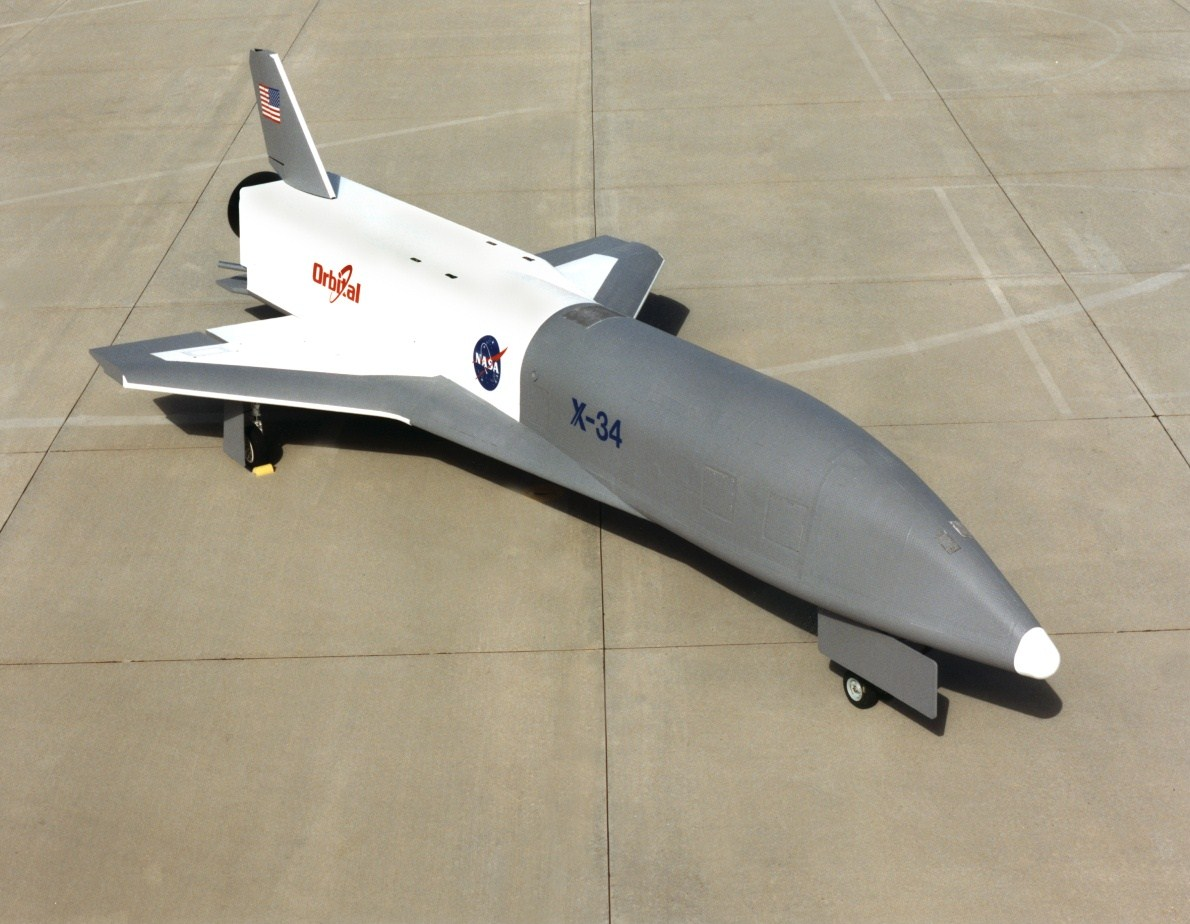
- The X-34 on the tarmac
- Function: Unmanned re-usable spaceplane
- Manufacturer: Orbital Sciences Corporation
- Country of origin: United States

Size
- Height: 11.5 ft (3.5 m)
- Diameter: n/a
- Length: 58.3 ft (17.77 m)
- Wingspan: 27.7 ft (8.44 m)
- Mass: 18,000 lb (8,200 kg)
- Stages: 1

Capacity

Launch history
- Status: Cancelled (March, 2001)
- Launch sites: Dryden Flight Research Center, Kennedy Space Center
- Total launches: 0

First stage - X-34
- Engines: 1 Marshall-designed Fastrac engine
- Thrust: 60,000 lbf (270 kN)
- Propellant: LOX/kerosene

The Orbital Sciences X-34 was intended to be a low-cost testbed for demonstrating "key technologies" that could be integrated into the Reusable Launch Vehicle program. It was intended to be an autonomous pilotless craft powered by a "Fastrac" liquid-propellant rocket engine, capable of reaching Mach 8 and performing 25 test flights per year.

== History ==
The X-34 began as a program for a suborbital reusable-rocket technology demonstrator. In early 2001, the first flight vehicle was near completion, but the program was ended due to budget concerns. Up to this point, the project had encompassed spending of just under $112 million: $85.7M from the original contract with designer Orbital Sciences, $16M from NASA and various government agencies for testing, and an additional $10M for Orbital Sciences to adapt its L-1011 carrier aircraft to accommodate the X-34. The program was officially canceled by NASA on March 31, 2001. The unpowered prototype had been used only for towing and captive flight tests when the project was canceled.

The two demonstrators remained in storage at Edwards Air Force Base until they were temporarily moved to Mojave, California, in late 2010. This prompted some speculation that they might be restored to flight status. Before April 2020, the spaceplanes were lying in the yard of a crane company in nearby Lancaster, California, before being relocated to a scrapyard.

== Gallery ==
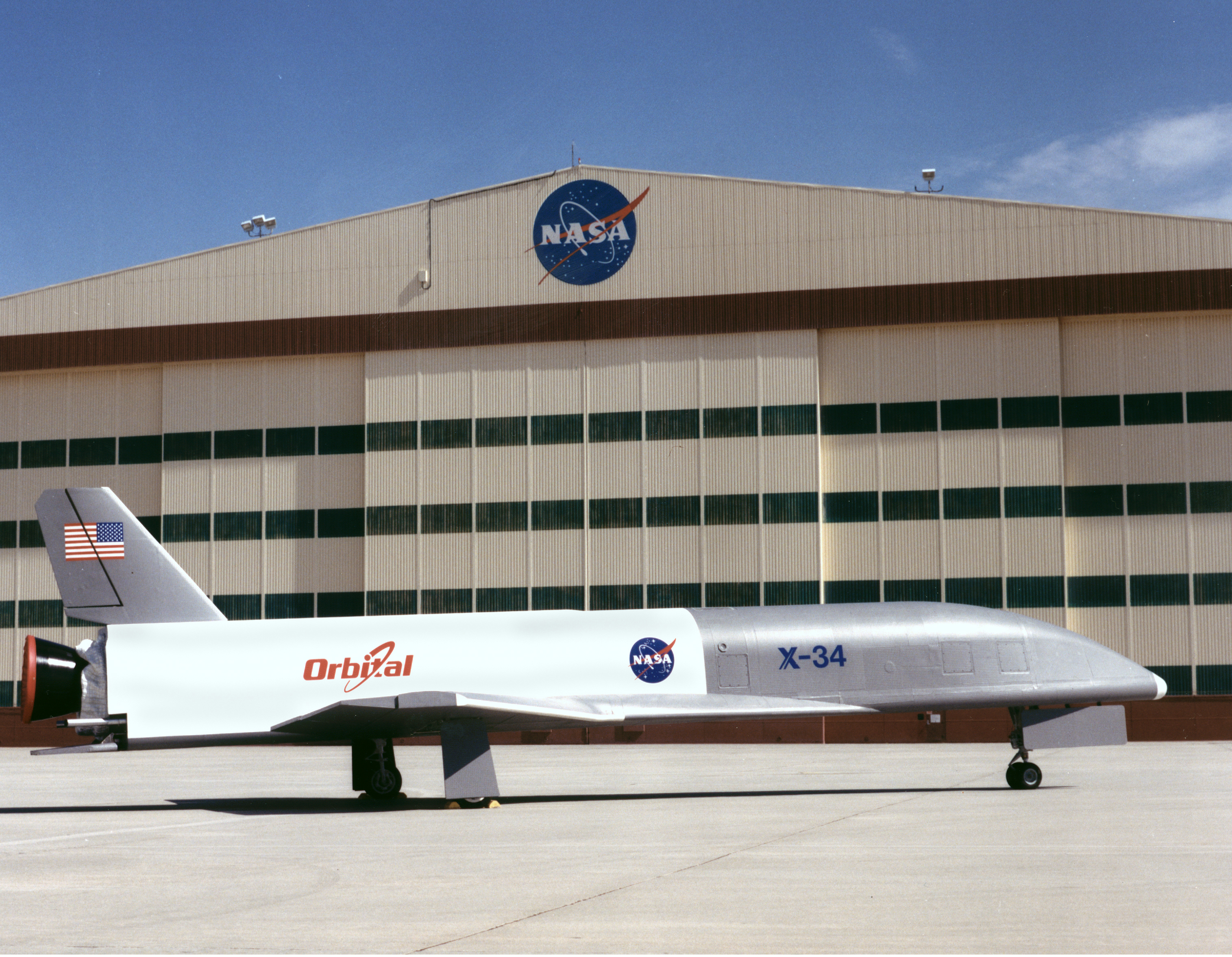
On display outside Dryden Research Center in 2000

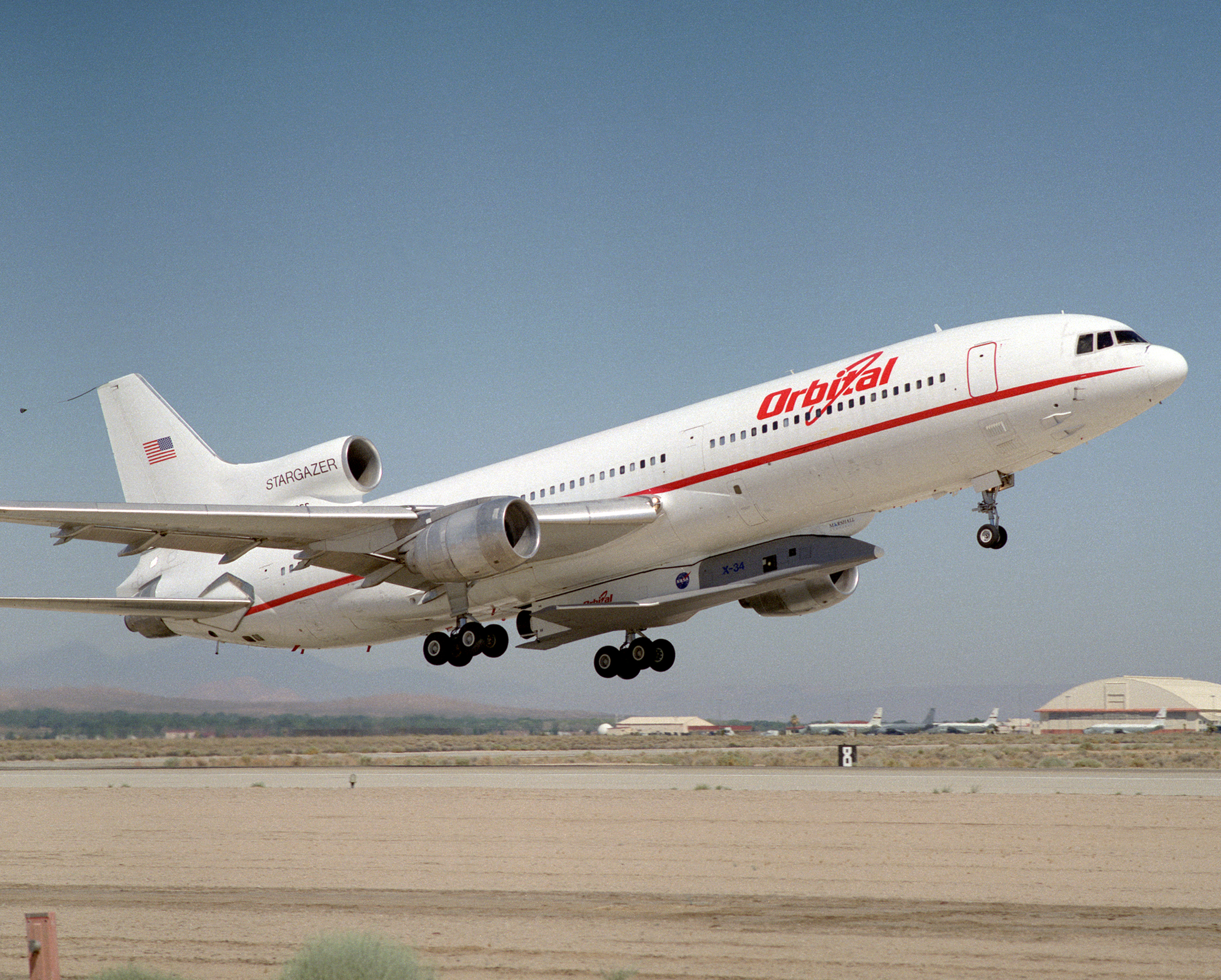
Mated to the mothership Stargazer in 2000

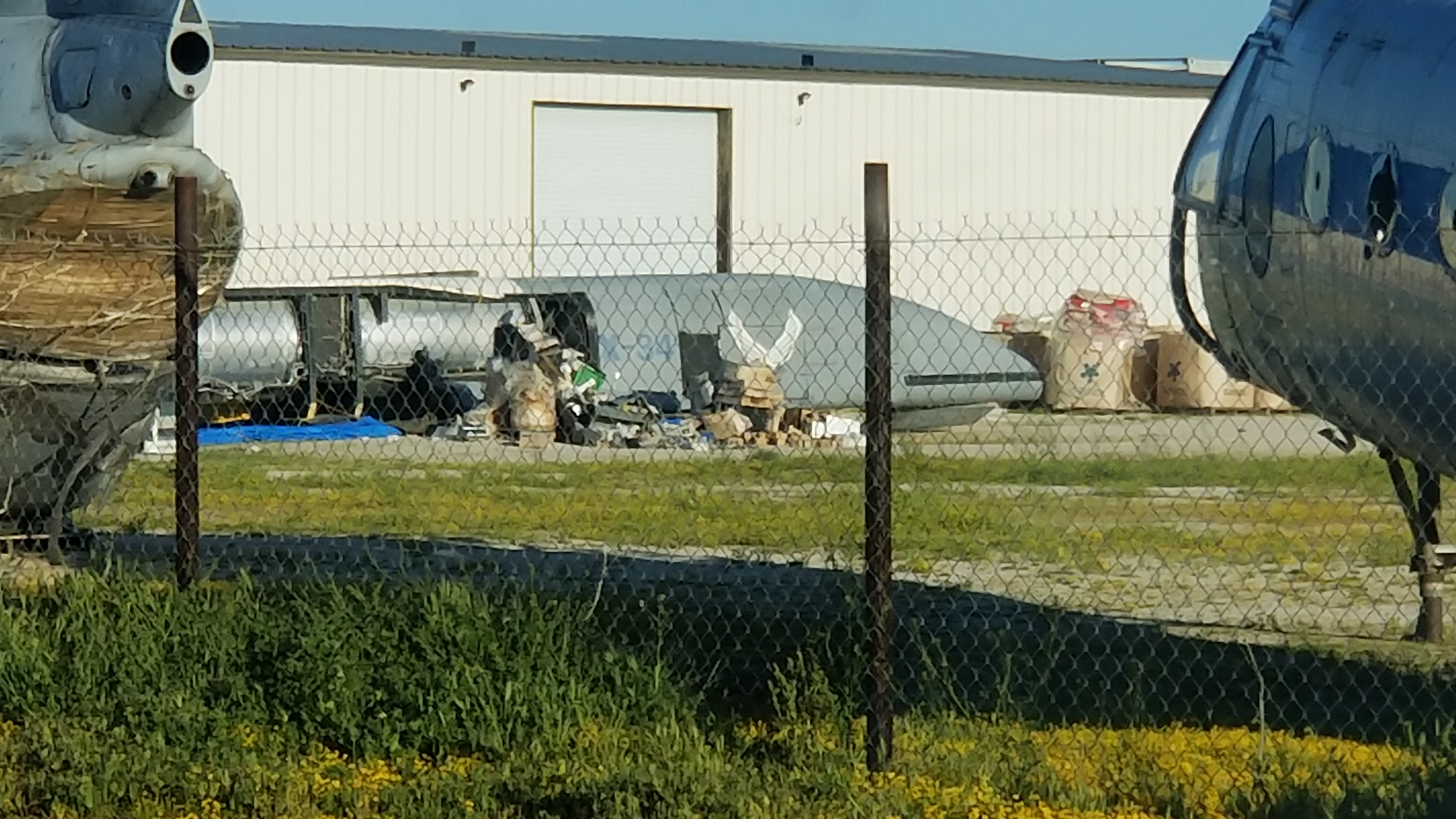
A photo of one of the testbed fuselages in a scrapyard outside Edwards Air Force Base in April 2020

== See also ==
- List of experimental aircraft
- Cygnus (spacecraft)
- Lockheed Martin X-33
- Prometheus (spacecraft) (CCdev)
- Sierra Nevada Dream Chaser (CCdev)
