= SpaceX Draco =

Line of hypergolic liquid rocket engines by SpaceX

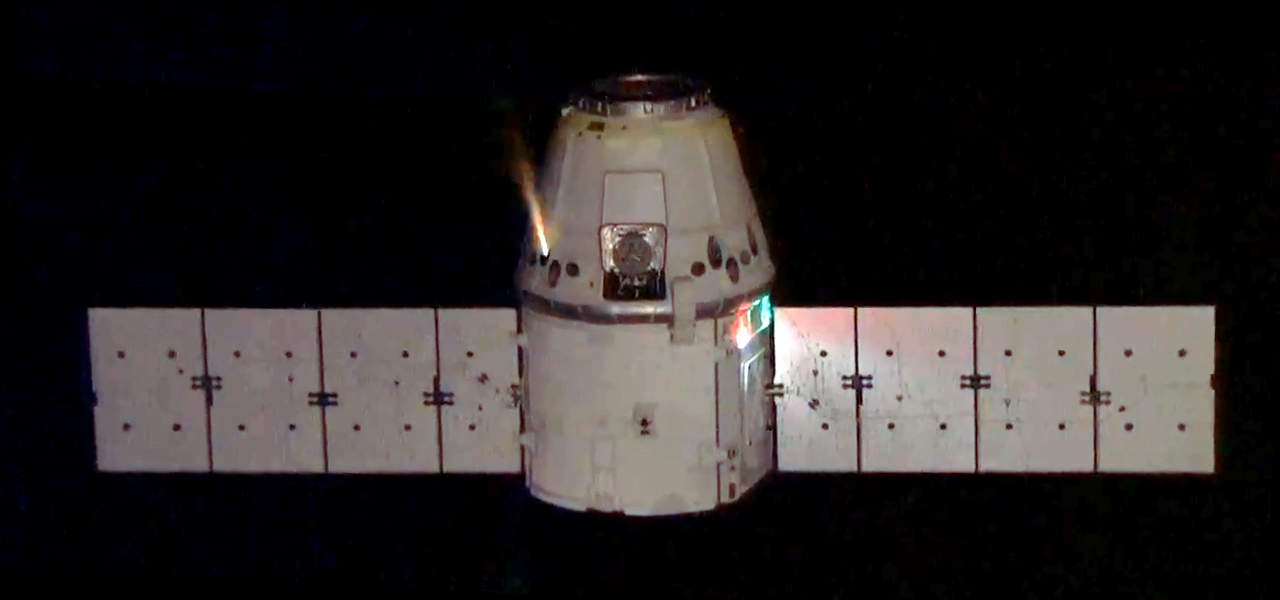
- A SpaceX Dragon spacecraft approaching the International Space Station fires one of its 16 Draco thrusters.
- Country of origin: United States
- Manufacturer: SpaceX
- Application: Reaction control system

Liquid-fuel engine
- Propellant: NTO / MMH

Performance
- Thrust, vacuum: 400 N (90 lbf)
- Specific impulse, vacuum: 300 s (2.9 km/s)

Used in
- SpaceX Dragon

The SpaceX Draco is a hypergolic liquid rocket engine designed and built by SpaceX for use in their space capsules. Two engine types have been built to date: Draco and SuperDraco.

The original Draco thruster is a small rocket engine for use on the Dragon spacecraft.

SuperDraco uses the same storable (non-cryogenic) hypergolic propellant as the small Draco thrusters, but is much larger and delivers over 100 times the thrust. SuperDraco engines are being used on the Crew Dragon spacecraft to provide launch-escape capability in case of a failure in the launch vehicle.

Draco and SuperDraco combine the functions of a reaction control system and main propulsive engine.

== Draco ==
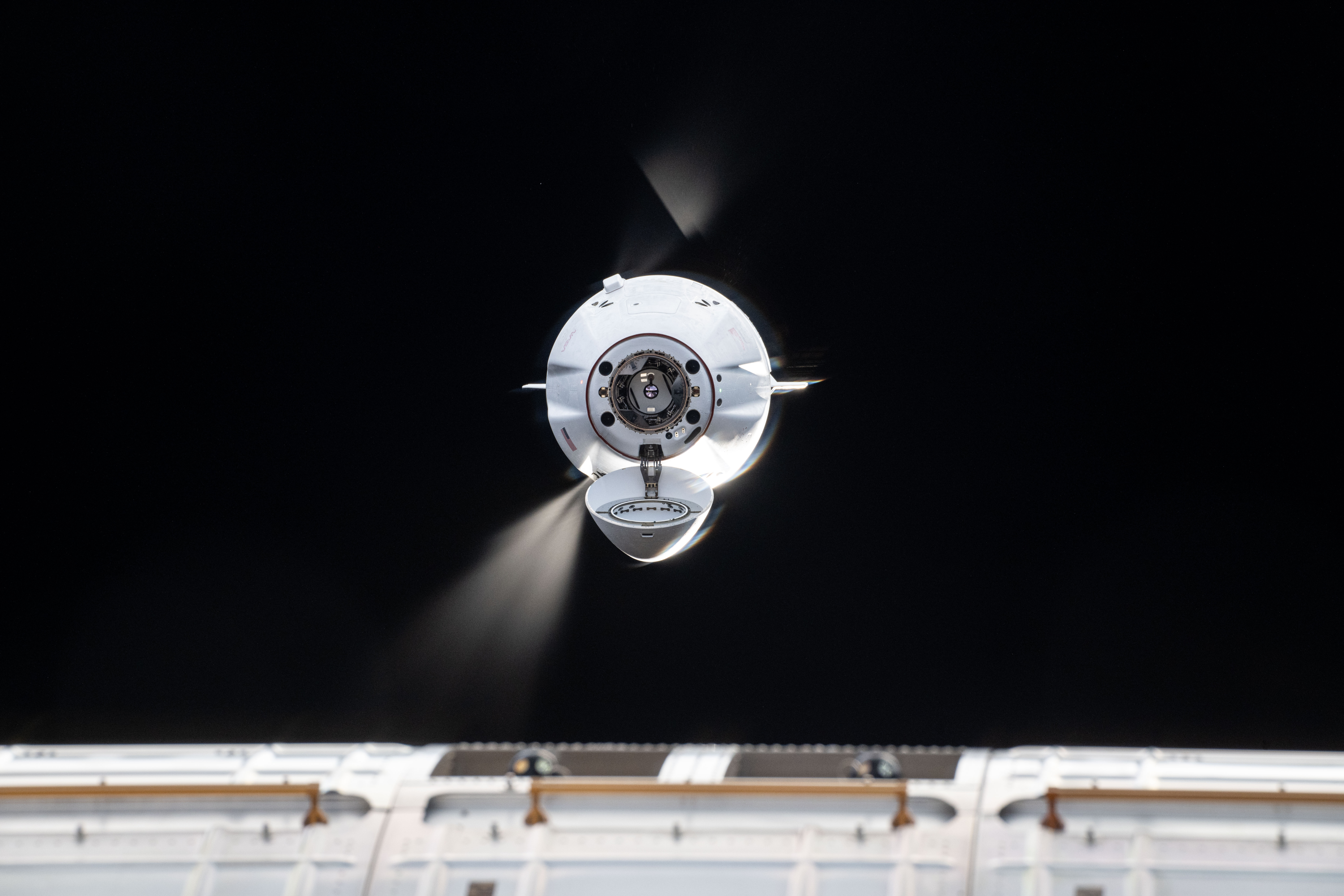
Cargo Dragon C211 fires its Draco thrusters as it approaches ISS

Draco thrusters generate 400 newtons (90 pounds-force) of thrust using a storable propellant mixture of monomethyl hydrazine fuel and nitrogen tetroxide oxidizer. The Draco thrust is comparable to the Marquardt R-4D engine developed for the Apollo Service and Lunar Modules in the 1960s and used for apogee/perigee maneuvers, orbit adjustment, and attitude control.

Sixteen Draco thrusters are used on the Dragon spacecraft for attitude control and maneuvering.

== SuperDraco ==
On February 1, 2012 SpaceX announced that it had completed the development of a new, more powerful storable-propellant rocket engine, this one called SuperDraco. This high-thrust hypergolic engine—about 200 times larger than the Draco RCS thruster hypergolic engine—offers deep throttling ability and just like the Draco thruster, has multiple restart capability and uses the same shared hypergolic propellants. Its primary purpose is for SpaceX's LAS (launch abort system) on the Dragon spacecraft. According to the NASA press release, the engine has a transient from ignition to full thrust of 100 ms. The development of the engine was partially funded by NASA's CCDev 2 program.

SuperDracos are used on both the Crew Dragon and were used on the SpaceX DragonFly, a prototype low-altitude test article that was used for flight testing various aspects of the propulsive-landing technology. While the engine is capable of 73,000 newtons (16,400 lbf) of thrust, during use for DragonFly testing, the engines were planned to be throttled to 68,170 newtons (15,325 lbf) to maintain vehicle stability. First firing of all 8 Super Draco engines took place on 6 May 2015 at 9am EDT at the SpaceX Crew Dragon Pad Abort Test.

SuperDraco engines are capable of being restarted many times, and have the capability to deeply reduce their thrust providing precise control during propulsive landing of the Dragon capsule. SpaceX have since announced they will not be using propulsive landing on the Dragon 2.

As of 2015, SuperDraco is the third most powerful engine developed by SpaceX, approximately 200 times more powerful than the Draco RCS thruster engines, and only outmatched by the Raptor and Merlin.

In addition to the use of the SuperDraco thrusters for powered-landings on Earth, NASA's Ames Research Center studied the feasibility of a Dragon-derived Mars lander for scientific investigation until 2017. Preliminary analysis indicated that the final deceleration needed would be within the retro-propulsion SuperDraco thruster capabilities.

== See also ==
- SpaceX Kestrel
- SpaceX Merlin
- SpaceX Raptor
