= Tom Mueller =

American aerospace engineer and rocket engine designer

- Born: Thomas John Mueller; March 11, 1961 (age 65); St. Maries, Idaho, US
- Education: University of Idaho (BS); Loyola Marymount University (MS)
- Occupations: Founder and CEO of Impulse Space
- Engineering career
- Significant design: TR-106; SpaceX Merlin; SpaceX Draco; SpaceX SuperDraco

Thomas John Mueller is an American aerospace engineer and rocket engine designer. He was employee No.1 of SpaceX and is the founder and now CEO of Impulse Space.

Mueller is best known for his engineering work on the Merlin, Draco, Super Draco and TR-106 rocket engines. He is considered one of the world's leading spacecraft propulsion experts and holds several United States patents for propulsion technology. As of October 2026, Forbes estimated his net worth at US$2.1 billion.

== Early life and education ==
Mueller was born in St. Maries, Idaho. His father was a logger and wanted Mueller to be one as well. Mueller compares his story to that of Homer Hickam, growing up in a hard-working family and going off to be an engineer instead of following in his father's footsteps. As a kid, he would build and fly Estes model rockets. He continued to experiment with rockets, even building one out of his father's oxy-acetylene welder and discovering adding water would produce more thrust.

Mueller eventually became a logger, working four summers to pay his way through school. He attended the University of Idaho where in 1985 he earned a bachelor's degree in mechanical engineering. He moved to California upon graduating, turning down job offers in Idaho and Oregon. He attended a job fair upon his arrival in California and began working in satellite design and moved on to developing liquid rocket engines. Mueller went on to attend Loyola Marymount University where he obtained his master's degree in Mechanical Engineering in 1992 from the Frank R. Seaver College of Science and Engineering.

== Career ==
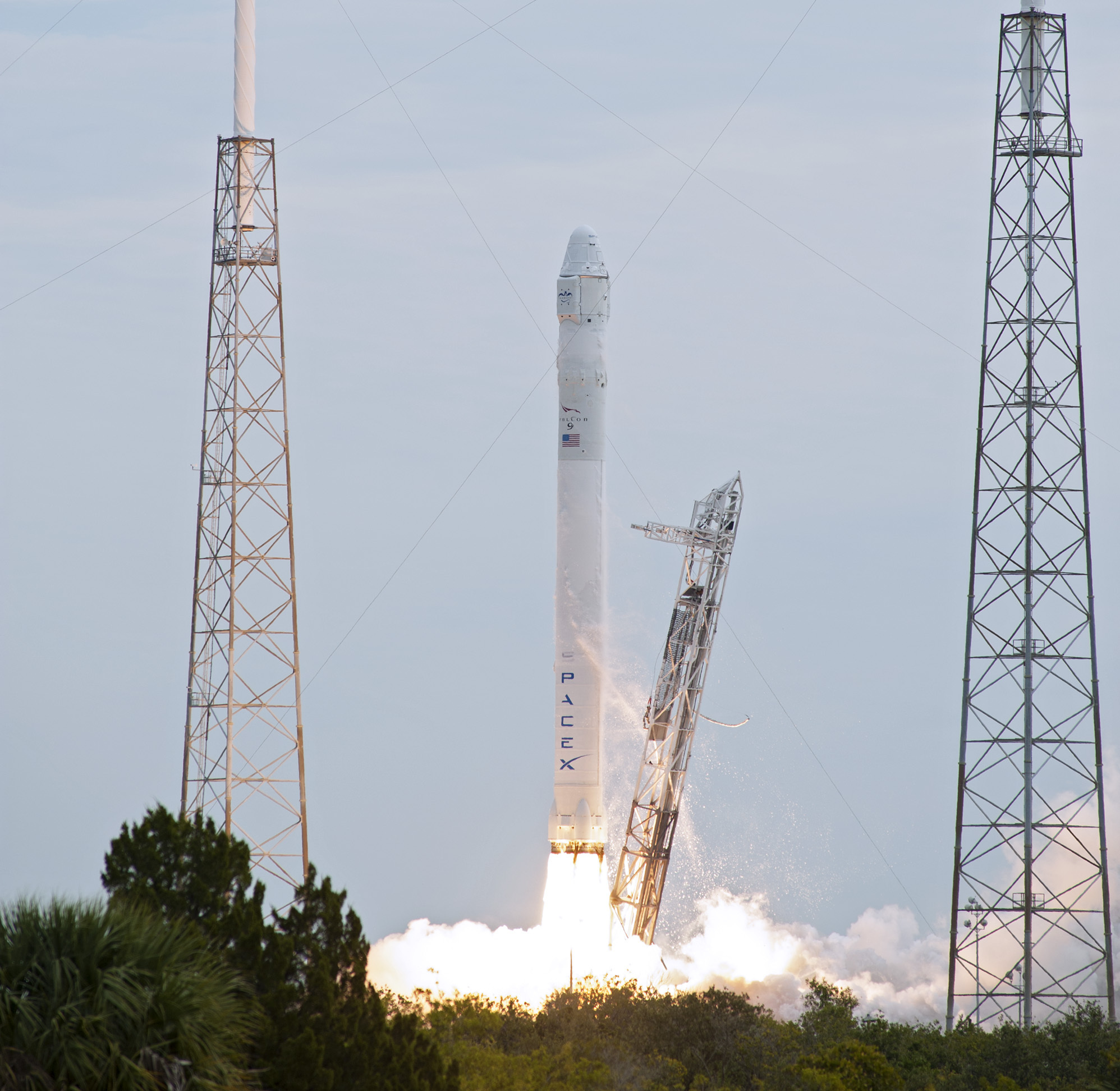
Tom Mueller designed the Merlin engines used on the Falcon 9 rocket.

=== TRW Inc. ===
For 15 years, Mueller worked for TRW Inc., a conglomerate corporation involved in aerospace, automotive, credit reporting, and electronics. He managed the propulsion and combustion products department where he was responsible for liquid rocket engine development. He worked as a lead engineer during the development of the TR-106, a 650,000 lbf (2,900 kN) thrust, throttled, cost-contained hydrogen engine designed in 2000. During his time at TRW, Mueller felt that his ideas were being lost in a diverse corporation and as a hobby he began to build his own engines. Along with other members of the Reaction Research Society he would attach them to airframes and launch them in the Mojave Desert. In late 2001, Mueller began developing a liquid-fueled rocket engine in his garage and later moved his project to a friend's warehouse in 2002. His design was the largest amateur liquid-fuel rocket engine, weighing 80 lb (36 kg) and producing 13,000 lbf (58 kN) of thrust. His work caught the attention of Elon Musk, SpaceX founder.

=== SpaceX ===
In 2002 Mueller joined Musk as the founding employee of SpaceX. As Vice President of Propulsion Engineering and subsequently CTO of Propulsion at SpaceX, Mueller led the team that developed the Merlin 1A and Kestrel engines for the Falcon 1, the first privately developed liquid-fueled rocket to reach orbit; the Merlin 1C, Merlin 1D and MVac engines for the early iterations of the Falcon 9 launch vehicle; the Draco thrusters that provide the attitude control thrusters for the Dragon spacecraft and the SuperDraco storable-propellant engines used to power the capsule launch escape system. Dragon was the first commercial spacecraft to berth with the International Space Station. In 2014, Mueller transitioned engine development to the SpaceX Propulsion Engineering team and in 2016 he moved into the role of Propulsion CTO. In January 2019 he became Senior Advisor (Part-Time). Tom Mueller announced that he retired from SpaceX on November 30, 2020.

=== Impulse Space ===
Mueller founded Impulse Space in 2021. The company develops chemical rocket engines, space tugs for moving satellites on-orbit, and planetary landers to deliver payloads to Mars.

== Awards ==
In 2014, Mueller was nominated for the Wyld Award, presented by the American Institute of Aeronautics and Astronautics (AIAA) for outstanding achievement in the development or application of rocket propulsion systems.

He was a commencement speaker for Loyola Marymount University graduate students in 2013, the year after SpaceX became the first private company to send a cargo payload to the International Space Station.
