= SpaceX Kestrel =

Family of rocket engines developed by SpaceX for use on its Falcon 1 launch vehicles

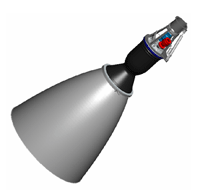
- SpaceX Kestrel
- Country of origin: United States
- First flight: 2006
- Last flight: 2009
- Designer: Tom Mueller
- Manufacturer: SpaceX
- Application: Upper stage boost

Liquid-fuel engine
- Propellant: LOX / RP-1
- Cycle: Pressure fed

Performance
- Thrust, vacuum: 28 kN (2.9 t_{f})
- Thrust-to-weight ratio: 65
- Chamber pressure: 9.3 bar (135 psi)
- Specific impulse, vacuum: 317 seconds (3.11 km/s)

Dimensions
- Dry mass: 52 kg (115 lb)

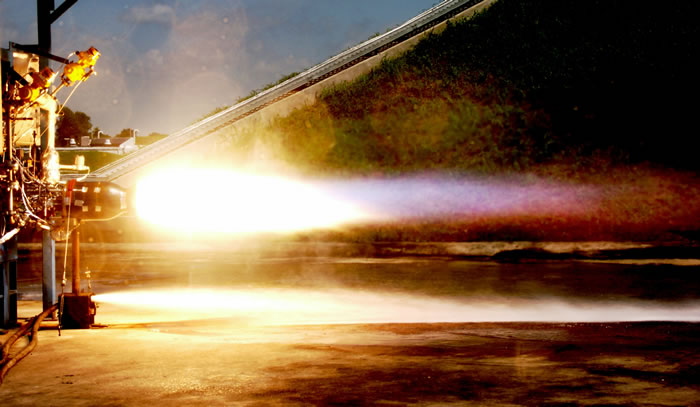
Kestrel engine test firing.

The SpaceX Kestrel was an LOX/RP-1 pressure-fed rocket engine. The Kestrel engine was developed in the 2000s by SpaceX for upper stage use on the Falcon 1 rocket. Kestrel is no longer being manufactured; the last flight of Falcon 1 was in 2009.

Kestrel was built around the same pintle architecture as the SpaceX Merlin engine but does not have a turbopump and is fed only by tank pressure.

Kestrel was ablatively cooled in the chamber and throat and radiatively cooled in the nozzle, which was fabricated from a high strength niobium alloy. As a metal, niobium is highly resistant to cracking compared to carbon-carbon. According to SpaceX, an impact from orbital debris or during stage separation might dent the metal but have no meaningful effect on engine performance. Helium pressurant efficiency is substantially increased via a titanium heat exchanger on the ablative/niobium boundary.

Thrust vector control is provided by electro-mechanical actuators on the engine dome for pitch and yaw. Roll control (and attitude control during coast phases) is provided by helium cold gas thrusters.

A TEA-TEB pyrophoric ignition system is used to provide restart capability on the upper stage and simplify design. In a multi-manifested mission, this design would allow for drop off at different altitudes and inclinations.

== Kestrel 2 ==
Enhancements to the design of the original Kestrel engine were planned, called the Kestrel 2.

The engine design was still pressure-fed, and was supposed to fly on a newly designed second stage that used Aluminium-lithium alloy 2195, rather than the 2014 Aluminum used in the Falcon 1 second stage. Engine changes were to include tighter tolerances to improve consistency, higher I_{sp}, and lighter weight. The Kestrel 2 did not remain in active development after the Falcon 1 was replaced by the much larger Falcon 9 v1.0 which used an improved Merlin 1C for its upper stage.

== See also ==
- SpaceX Draco
- SpaceX Merlin
- SpaceX Raptor
