= SpaceX Merlin =

Rocket engine in SpaceX Falcon launch vehicles

Merlin 1D
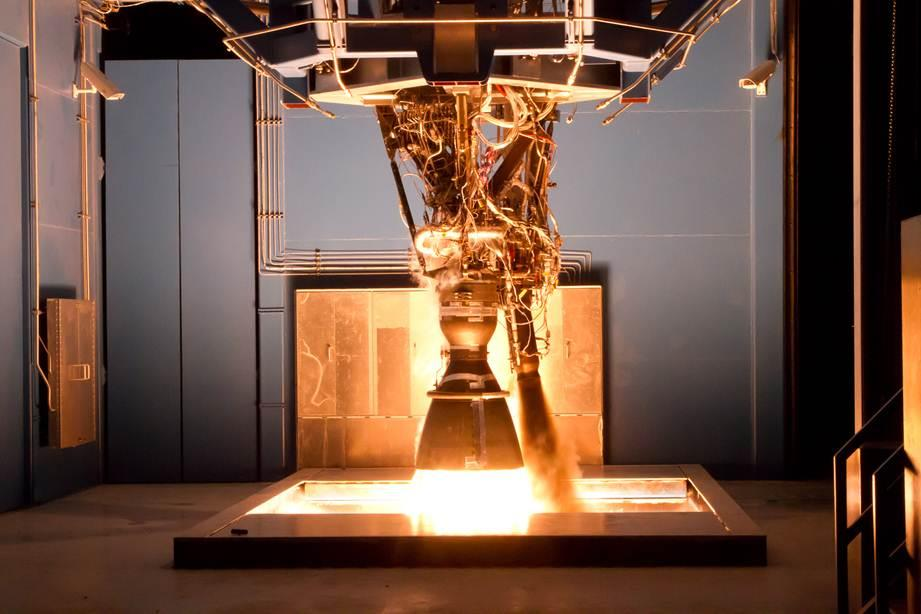
- Test firing of the Merlin 1D at SpaceX’s McGregor test stand
- Country of origin: United States
- Manufacturer: SpaceX
- Application: Booster stage engine; Upper stage engine
- Associated LV: Falcon 1 · Falcon 9 · Falcon Heavy
- Status: Active

Liquid-fuel engine
- Propellant: LOX / RP-1
- Cycle: Gas-generator

Performance
- Thrust, vacuum: 981 kN (221,000 lb_{f})
- Thrust, sea-level: 845 kN (190,000 lb_{f})
- Thrust-to-weight ratio: 184
- Chamber pressure: 9.7 MPa (1,410 psi)
- Specific impulse, vacuum: 311 s (3.05 km/s)
- Specific impulse, sea-level: 282 s (2.77 km/s)

Dimensions
- Diameter: Sea level: 0.92 m (3.0 ft); Vacuum: 3.3 m (11 ft)
- Dry mass: 470 kg (1,030 lb)

Merlin is a family of rocket engines developed by SpaceX. They are currently a part of the Falcon 9 and Falcon Heavy launch vehicles, and were formerly used on the Falcon 1. Merlin engines use RP-1 and liquid oxygen as rocket propellants in a gas-generator power cycle. The Merlin engine was originally designed for sea recovery and reuse, but since 2016 the entire Falcon 9 booster is recovered for reuse by landing vertically on a landing pad using one of its nine Merlin engines.

The injector at the heart of Merlin is of the pintle type that was first used in the Apollo Lunar Module landing engine (LMDE). Propellants are fed by a single-shaft, dual-impeller turbopump. The turbopump also provides high-pressure fluid for the hydraulic actuators, which then recycles into the low-pressure inlet. This eliminates the need for a separate hydraulic drive system and means that thrust vectoring control failure by running out of hydraulic fluid is not possible. The engine is named after the merlin, a small species of falcon.

== Revisions ==
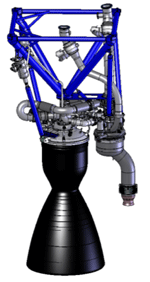
SpaceX Merlin 1A

=== Merlin 1A ===
The initial version, the Merlin 1A, used an inexpensive, expendable, ablatively cooled carbon-fiber-reinforced polymer composite nozzle and produced 340 kN (76,000 lbf) of thrust. The Merlin 1A flew only twice: first on March 24, 2006, when it caught fire and failed due to a fuel leak shortly after launch, and the second time on March 21, 2007, when it performed successfully. Both times the Merlin 1A was mounted on a Falcon 1 first stage.

The SpaceX turbopump was an entirely new, clean-sheet design contracted to Barber-Nichols, Inc. in 2002, who performed all design, engineering analysis, and construction; the company had previously worked on turbopumps for the RS-88 (Bantam) and NASA Fastrac engine programs. The Merlin 1A turbopump used a unique friction-welded main shaft, with Inconel 718 ends and an integral aluminum RP-1 impeller in the middle. The turbopump housing was constructed using investment castings, with Inconel at the turbine end, aluminum in the center, and 300-series stainless steel at the LOX end. The turbine was a partial-admission (i.e., working fluid is only admitted through part of the rotation of the turbine; an arc, not the whole circumference) impulse design and turned at up to 20,000 rpm, with a total weight of 68 kg (150 lb).

=== Merlin 1B ===
The Merlin 1B rocket engine was an upgraded version of the Merlin 1A engine. The turbopump upgrades were handled by Barber-Nichols, Inc. for SpaceX. It was intended for Falcon 1 launch vehicles, capable of producing 380 kN (85,000 lbf) of thrust at sea level and 420 kN (95,000 lbf) in vacuum, and performing with a specific impulse of 261 s (2.56 km/s) at sea level and 303 s (2.97 km/s) in vacuum.

The Merlin 1B was enhanced over the 1A with a turbine upgrade, increasing power output from 1,500 kW (2,000 hp) to 1,900 kW (2,500 hp). The turbine upgrade was accomplished by adding additional nozzles, turning the previously partial-admission design to full admission. Slightly enlarged impellers for both RP-1 and LOX were part of the upgrade. This model turned at a faster 22,000 rpm and developed higher discharge pressures. Turbopump weight was unchanged at 68 kg (150 lb). Another notable change over the 1A was the move to TEA–TEB (pyrophoric) ignition over torch ignition.

Initial use of the Merlin 1B was to be on the Falcon 9 launch vehicle, on whose first stage there would have been a cluster of nine of these engines. Due to experience from the Falcon 1's first flight, SpaceX moved its Merlin development to the Merlin 1C, which is regeneratively cooled. Therefore, the Merlin 1B was never used on a launch vehicle.

=== Merlin 1C ===
Merlin 1C
- Country of origin: United States
- Manufacturer: SpaceX
- Application: Booster stage engines; Upper stage engine
- Associated LV: Falcon 1, Falcon 9
- Status: Retired

Liquid-fuel engine
- Propellant: LOX / RP-1
- Cycle: Gas-generator

Performance
- Thrust, vacuum: 480 kN (110,000 lb_{f})
- Thrust, sea-level: 420 kN (94,000 lb_{f})
- Thrust-to-weight ratio: 96
- Chamber pressure: 6.77 MPa (982 psi)
- Specific impulse, vacuum: 304.8 s (2.989 km/s)
- Specific impulse, sea-level: 275 s (2.70 km/s)

Dimensions
- Length: 2.92 m (9 ft 7 in)
- Dry mass: 630 kg (1,380 lb)

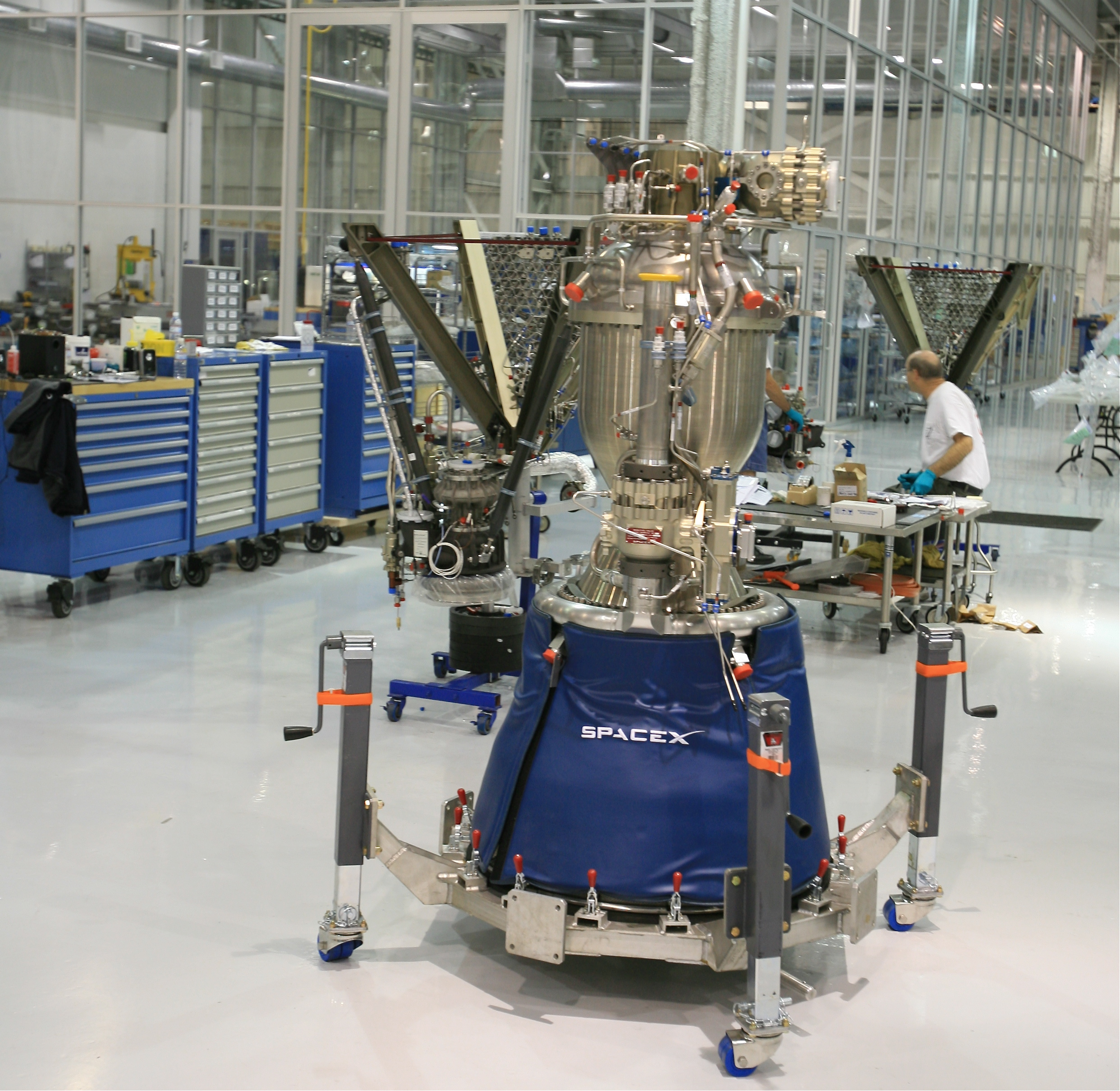
Merlin 1C under construction at SpaceX

Three versions of the Merlin 1C engine were produced. The Merlin engine for Falcon 1 had a movable turbopump exhaust assembly, which was used to provide roll control by vectoring the exhaust. The Merlin 1C engine for the Falcon 9 first stage is nearly identical to the variant used for the Falcon 1, although the turbopump exhaust assembly is not movable. Finally, a Merlin 1C vacuum variant is used on the Falcon 9 second stage. This engine differs from the Falcon 9 first-stage variant in that it uses a larger exhaust nozzle optimized for vacuum operation and can be throttled between 60% and 100%.

The Merlin 1C uses a regeneratively cooled nozzle and combustion chamber. The turbopump used is a Merlin 1B model with only slight alterations. It was fired with a full mission duty firing of 170 seconds in November 2007, first flew on a mission in August 2008, powered the "first privately-developed liquid-fueled rocket to successfully reach orbit", Falcon 1 Flight 4, in September 2008, and powered the Falcon 9 on its maiden flight in June 2010.

As configured for use on Falcon 1 vehicles, the Merlin 1C had a sea-level thrust of 350 kN (78,000 lbf), a vacuum thrust of 400 kN (90,000 lbf) and a vacuum specific impulse of 304 s (2.98 km/s). In this configuration, the engine consumed 140 kg (300 lb) of propellant per second. Tests have been conducted with a single Merlin 1C engine successfully running a total of 27 minutes (counting together the duration of the various tests), which equals ten complete Falcon 1 flights. The Merlin 1C chamber and nozzle are cooled regeneratively by 45 kg (100 lb) per second of kerosene flow and are able to absorb 10 MW (13,000 hp) of heat energy.

A Merlin 1C was first used as part of the unsuccessful third attempt to launch a Falcon 1. In discussing the failure, Elon Musk noted: "The flight of our first stage, with the new Merlin 1C engine that will be used in Falcon 9, was picture perfect." The Merlin 1C was used in the successful fourth flight of Falcon 1 on September 28, 2008.

On October 7, 2012, a Merlin 1C (Engine No. 1) of the CRS-1 mission experienced an anomaly at T+00:01:20, which appears on CRS-1 launch video as a flash. The failure occurred just as the vehicle achieved max-Q (maximum aerodynamic pressure). SpaceX's internal review found that the engine was shut down after a sudden pressure loss and that only the aerodynamic shell was destroyed, generating the debris seen in the video; the engine did not explode, as SpaceX ground control continued to receive data from it throughout the flight. The primary mission was unaffected by the anomaly due to the nominal operation of the remaining eight engines and an onboard readjustment of the flight trajectory, but the secondary-mission payload failed to reach its target orbit due to safety protocols in place to prevent collisions with the ISS. These protocols prevented a second firing of the upper stage for the secondary payload.

SpaceX was planning to develop a 560 kN (130,000 lbf) version of Merlin 1C to be used in Falcon 9 Block II and Falcon 1E boosters. This engine and these booster models were dropped in favor of the more advanced Merlin 1D engine and longer Falcon 9 v1.1 booster.

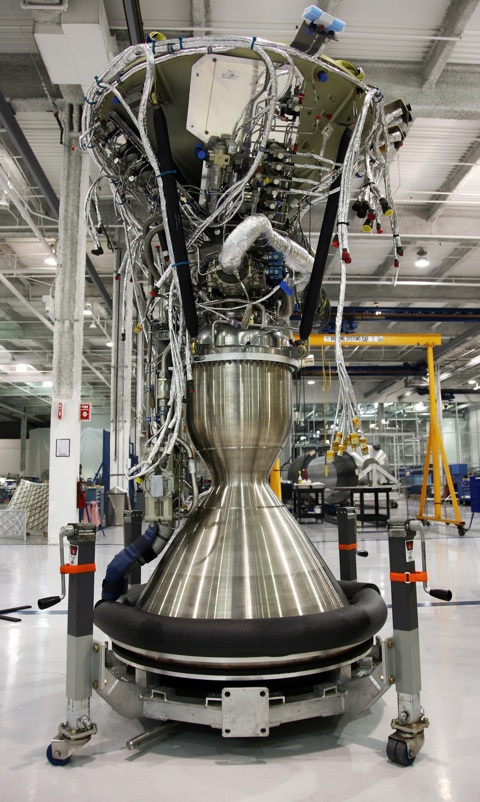
Merlin 1C Vacuum engine at Hawthorne factory in 2008

=== Merlin Vacuum (1C) ===
On March 10, 2009, a SpaceX press release announced successful testing of the Merlin Vacuum engine. A variant of the 1C engine, Merlin Vacuum features a larger exhaust section and a significantly larger expansion nozzle to maximize the engine's efficiency in the vacuum of space. Its combustion chamber is regeneratively cooled, while the 2.7-meter-long (9 ft) niobium alloy expansion nozzle is radiatively cooled. The engine delivers a vacuum thrust of 411 kN (92,500 lbf) and a vacuum specific impulse of 342 s (3.35 km/s). The first production Merlin Vacuum engine underwent a full-duration orbital-insertion firing (329 seconds) of the integrated Falcon 9 second stage on January 2, 2010. It was flown on the second stage for the inaugural Falcon 9 flight on June 4, 2010. At full power and as of March 10, 2009, the Merlin Vacuum engine operates with the greatest efficiency of any American-made hydrocarbon-fueled rocket engine.

An unplanned test of a modified Merlin Vacuum engine was made in December 2010. Shortly before the scheduled second flight of the Falcon 9, two cracks were discovered in the 2.7-meter-long (9 ft) niobium-alloy-sheet nozzle of the Merlin Vacuum engine. The engineering solution was to cut off the lower 1.2 m (4 ft) of the nozzle and launch two days later, as the extra performance that would have been gained from the longer nozzle was not necessary to meet the objectives of the mission. The modified engine successfully placed the second stage into an orbit of 11,000 km (6,800 mi) altitude.

=== Merlin 1D ===
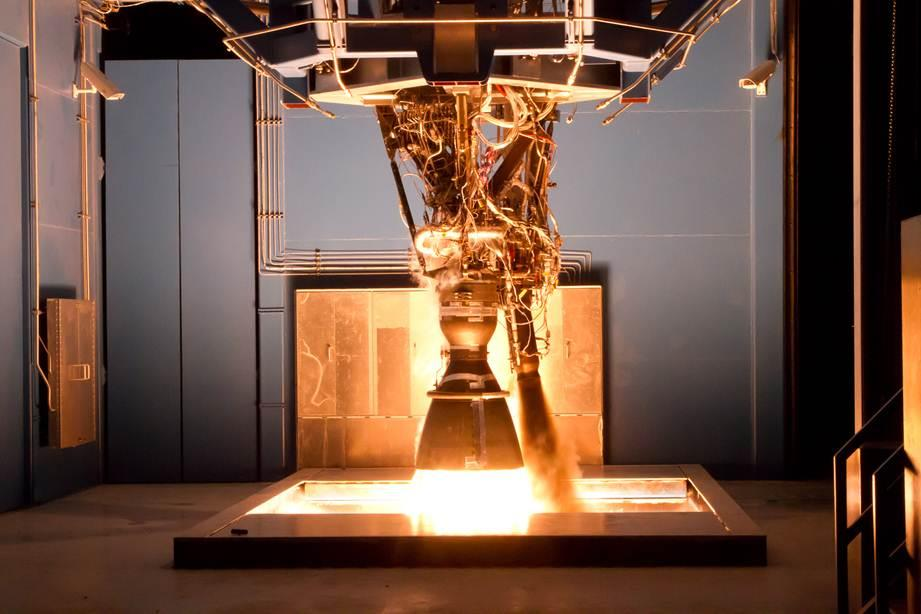
Merlin 1D engine undergoes a test at SpaceX's Rocket Development and Test Facility in McGregor, Texas

The Merlin 1D engine was developed by SpaceX between 2011 and 2012, with first flight in 2013. The design goals for the new engine included increased reliability, improved performance, and improved manufacturability. In 2011, performance goals for the engine were a vacuum thrust of 690 kN (155,000 lbf), a vacuum specific impulse (I_{sp}) of 310 s (3.0 km/s), an expansion ratio of 16 (as opposed to the previous 14.5 of the Merlin 1C) and chamber pressure in the "sweet spot" of 9.7 MPa (1,410 psi). Merlin 1D was originally designed to throttle between 100% and 70% of maximal thrust; however, further refinements since 2013 now allow the engine to throttle to 40%.

The basic Merlin fuel/oxidizer mixture ratio is controlled by the sizing of the propellant supply tubes to each engine, with only a small amount of the total flow trimmed out by a "servo-motor-controlled butterfly valve" to provide fine control of the mixture ratio.

On November 24, 2013, Elon Musk stated that the engine was actually operating at 85% of its potential, and they anticipated to be able to increase the sea-level thrust to about 730 kN (165,000 lbf) and a thrust-to-weight ratio of 180. This version of the Merlin 1D was used on Falcon 9 Full Thrust and first flew on Flight 20.

In May 2016, SpaceX announced plans to further upgrade the Merlin 1D by increasing vacuum thrust to 914 kN (205,000 lbf) and sea-level thrust to 845 kN (190,000 lbf); according to SpaceX, the additional thrust will increase the Falcon 9 LEO payload capability to about 22 metric tons on a fully expendable mission. SpaceX also noted that unlike the previous Full Thrust iteration of the Falcon 9 vehicle, the increase in performance is solely due to upgraded engines, and no other significant changes to the vehicle are publicly planned.

In May 2018, ahead of the first flight of Falcon 9 Block 5, SpaceX announced that the 845 kN (190,000 lbf) goal had been achieved. The Merlin 1D is now close to the sea-level thrust of the retired Rocketdyne H-1 / RS-27 engines used on Saturn I, Saturn IB, and Delta II.

On February 23, 2024, one of the nine Merlin engines powering that launch flew its 22nd mission, which was at the time the flight leading engine. It is already the most flown rocket engine to date, surpassing Space Shuttle Main Engine no. 2019's record of 19 flights.

==== Anomalies ====
The March 18, 2020, launch of Starlink satellites on board a Falcon 9 experienced an early engine shutdown on ascent. The shutdown occurred 2 minutes 22 seconds into the flight and was accompanied with an "event" seen on camera. The rest of the Falcon 9 engines burned longer and did deliver the payload to orbit. However, the first stage was not successfully recovered. In a subsequent investigation SpaceX found that isopropyl alcohol, used as cleaning fluid, was trapped and ignited, causing the engine to be shut down. To address the issue, in a following launch SpaceX indicated that the cleaning process was not done.

On October 2, 2020, the launch of a GPS-III satellite was aborted at T-2 seconds due to a detected early startup on 2 of the 9 engines on the first stage. The engines were removed for further testing and it was found that a port in the gas generator was blocked. After removing the blockage the engines started as intended. After this, SpaceX inspected other engines across its fleet and found that two of the engines on the Falcon 9 rocket intended for the Crew-1 launch also had this problem. Those engines were replaced with new M1D engines.

On February 16, 2021, on Falcon 9 flight 108 launching Starlink satellites, an engine shut down early due to hot exhaust gasses passing through a damaged heat-shielding cover. The mission was a success, but the booster could not be recovered.

=== Merlin 1D Vacuum ===
A vacuum version of the Merlin 1D engine was developed for the Falcon 9 v1.1 and the Falcon Heavy second stage. As of 2020, the thrust of the Merlin 1D Vacuum is 220,500 lbf (981 kN) with a specific impulse of 348 seconds, the highest specific impulse ever for a U.S. hydrocarbon rocket engine. The increase is due to the greater expansion ratio afforded by operating in vacuum, now 165:1 using an updated nozzle extension.

The engine can throttle down to 39% of its maximum thrust, or 360 kN (81,000 lbf).

==== Merlin 1D Vacuum improvements and variants ====
Transporter-7 mission launch debuted a new Merlin Vacuum engine (MVac for short) nozzle extension design or variant aimed at increasing cadence and reducing costs. This new nozzle extension is shorter and, as a result, decreases both performance and material usage. This nozzle is only used on lower-performance missions, as with this nozzle, the MVac engine produces 10% less thrust in space. The nozzle decreases the amount of material needed by 75%; this means that SpaceX can launch over three times as many missions with the same amount of rare niobium metal as with the longer design.

==== Anomalies ====
On July 11, 2024, Falcon 9 flight 354 launching Starlink group 9-3 from Vandenberg AFB in California experienced an anomaly with its MVac during an engine relight attempt to raise the perigee of the 22 Starlink satellites for deployment. On X, Elon Musk and SpaceX both confirmed the engine failed explosively during a second attempted relight, albeit in a manner that did not appear to damage the second stage of the vehicle as the stage went on to deploy the satellites on board.

== Design ==
=== Engine control ===
SpaceX uses a triple-redundant design in the Merlin engine computers. The system uses three computers in each processing unit, each constantly checking on the others, to instantiate a fault-tolerant design. One processing unit is part of each of the ten Merlin engines (nine on the first stage, one on the second stage) used on the Falcon 9 launch vehicle.

=== Turbopump ===
The Merlin LOX/RP-1 turbopump used on Merlin engines 1A–1C was designed and developed by Barber-Nichols. It spins at 36,000 revolutions per minute, delivering 10,000 horsepower (7,500 kW).

=== Gas generator ===
The LOX/RP-1 turbopump on each Merlin engine is powered by a fuel-rich open-cycle gas generator similar to that used in the Apollo-era Rocketdyne F-1 engine.

== Production ==
As of August 2011, SpaceX was producing Merlin engines at the rate of eight per month, planning eventually to raise production to about 33 engines per month (or 400 per year). By September 2013, SpaceX total manufacturing space had increased to nearly 93,000 square meters (1 million square feet), and the factory had been configured to achieve a maximum production rate of up to 40 rocket cores per year, enough to use the 400 annual engines envisioned by the earlier engine plan. By October 2014, SpaceX announced that it had manufactured the 100th Merlin 1D engine and that engines were now being produced at a rate of four per week, soon to be increased to five.

In February 2016, SpaceX indicated that the company will need to build hundreds of engines a year in order to support a Falcon 9/Falcon Heavy build rate of 30 rocket cores per year by the end of 2016. On July 1, 2026, SpaceX celebrated the completed build and acceptance testing of the 1,000th Merlin 1D engine for Falcon 9's first stage.

Each Falcon 9 booster uses nine Merlin engines, and the second stage uses one Merlin vacuum engine. The second stage is expended, so each launch consumes one Merlin Vacuum engine. SpaceX designed the booster with its engines to be recovered for reuse by propulsive landing, and the first recovered booster was reused in March 2017. By 2020, only five of the 26 Falcon 9 launched that year used new boosters. By 2021, only two of the 31 Falcon 9 launches used new boosters.

== Past engine concepts ==
=== Merlin 2 concept ===
At the American Institute of Aeronautics and Astronautics Joint Propulsion conference on July 30, 2010, SpaceX McGregor rocket development facility director Tom Markusic shared some information from the initial stages of planning for a new engine. SpaceX’s Merlin 2 LOX/RP-1-fueled engine on a gas-generator cycle, capable of a projected 7,600 kN (1,700,000 lbf) of thrust at sea level and 8,500 kN (1,920,000 lbf) in a vacuum and would provide the power for conceptual super-heavy-lift launch vehicles from SpaceX, which Markusic dubbed Falcon X and Falcon XX. Such a capability, if built, would have resulted in an engine with more thrust than the F-1 engines used on the Saturn V.

Conceived to be potentially used on more capable variants of the Falcon 9 Heavy, Markusic indicated that the Merlin 2 "could be qualified in three years for $1 billion". By mid-August, SpaceX CEO Elon Musk clarified that while the Merlin 2 engine architecture was a key element of any effort SpaceX would make toward their objective of "super-heavy lift" launch vehicles—and that SpaceX did indeed want to "move toward super heavy lift"—the specific potential design configurations of the particular launch vehicles shown by Markusic at the propulsion conference were merely conceptual "brainstorming ideas", just a "bunch of ideas for discussion."

Since the original discussion, no work on any "Merlin 2" kerolox engine has been pursued and made public. At the 2011 Joint Propulsion Conference, Elon Musk stated that SpaceX were instead working towards a potential staged cycle engine. In October 2012, SpaceX publicly announced concept work on a rocket engine that would be "several times as powerful as the Merlin 1 series of engines, and won't use Merlin's RP-1 fuel". They indicated that the large engine was intended for a new SpaceX rocket, using multiple of these large engines could notionally launch payload masses of the order of 150 to 200 tonnes (170 to 220 short tons) to low Earth orbit. The forthcoming engine currently under development by SpaceX has been named "Raptor". Raptor will use liquid methane as a fuel, and was stated as having a sea-level thrust of 6,700 kilonewtons (1,500,000 lbf). Since the initial announcement of Raptor, Musk has updated the specification to approximately 230 tonnes-force (2,300 kN; 510,000 lbf)—about one-third the original published figure—based on the results of optimizing for thrust-to-weight ratio.

== See also ==
- SpaceX Draco – SpaceX RCS thruster for SpaceX Dragon
- SpaceX Kestrel – SpaceX small upper stage engine for Falcon 1
- SpaceX Raptor – SpaceX methane/LOX engine for the Starship
- Falcon 1 – First rocket powered by Merlin 1A
- Comparison of orbital rocket engines
- Rocket engine
- Pintle injector
- TR-106 – Low Cost Pintle Engine (LCPE) using LOX/LH2 developed by TRW in 2000
- TR-107 – RP-1 engine developed under SLI for future reusable launch vehicles
- RS-27A – RP-1 engine used in the US Delta II launcher; Saturn 1B H-1 heritage
- Rocketdyne F-1 – LOX/RP-1 main engine of the Saturn V Moon rocket
