= ITS launch vehicle =

SpaceX rocket design

Interplanetary Transport System
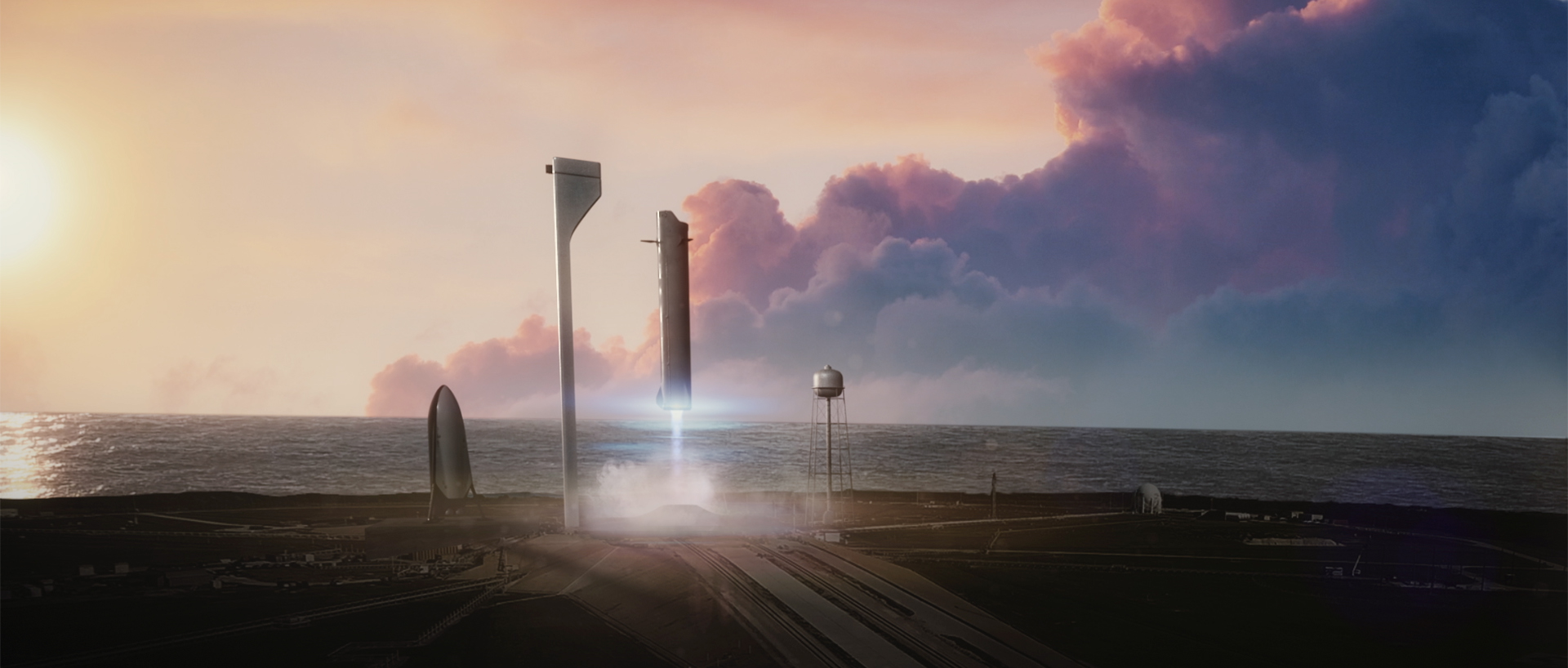
- Rendering of ITS launch vehicle landing on the launch pad
- Function: Mars colonization
- Manufacturer: SpaceX
- Country of origin: United States
- Project cost: US$10 billion (before generation of positive cash flow, 2016 estimate)
- Cost per launch: US$62 million per Mars mission (2016 estimate)

Size
- Height: 122 m (400 ft)
- Diameter: 12 m (39 ft) booster rocket
- Width: 17 m (56 ft) spaceship or tanker
- Mass: 10,500 t (23,100,000 lb)
- Stages: 2

Capacity

Payload to LEO
- Mass: 300 t (660,000 lb) reusable 550 t (1,210,000 lb) expendable

Payload to Mars
- Mass: 450 t (990,000 lb) with propellant refill in Earth orbit

Launch history
- Status: No launch vehicle hardware was ever built

First stage – ITS Booster
- Height: 77.5 m (254 ft)
- Diameter: 12 m (39 ft)
- Empty mass: 275 t (606,000 lb)
- Gross mass: 6,975 t (15,377,000 lb)
- Powered by: 42 Raptor (sea level)
- Maximum thrust: 128 MN (29×10^{6} lbf) sea level 138 MN (31×10^{6} lbf) vacuum
- Specific impulse: 334 s (3.28 km/s) sea level
- Propellant: Subcooled CH_{4} / LOX

Second stage – Interplanetary Spaceship
- Height: 49.5 m (162 ft)
- Width: 17 m (56 ft)
- Empty mass: 150 t (330,000 lb)
- Gross mass: 2,100 t (4,600,000 lb)
- Powered by: 9 Raptor (6 vacuum, 3 sea level)
- Maximum thrust: 31 MN (7.0×10^{6} lbf) vacuum
- Specific impulse: 382 s (3.75 km/s) vacuum, for 6 engines 361 s (3.54 km/s) vacuum, for 3 engines
- Propellant: Subcooled CH_{4} / LOX

Second stage – ITS Tanker
- Height: 49.5 m (162 ft)
- Width: 17 m (56 ft)
- Empty mass: 90 t (200,000 lb)
- Gross mass: 2,590 t (5,710,000 lb)
- Powered by: 9 Raptor (6 vacuum, 3 sea level)
- Maximum thrust: 31 MN (7.0×10^{6} lbf) vacuum
- Specific impulse: 382 s (3.75 km/s) vacuum, for 6 engines 361 s (3.54 km/s) vacuum, for 3 engines
- Propellant: Subcooled CH_{4} / LOX

The Interplanetary Transport System (ITS) was a 2016–2017 design for a privately funded very large 12-meter (39 ft)-diameter orbital launch vehicle planned to be developed by SpaceX. Design work was discontinued in 2017 when development was shifted to a smaller 9-meter version with approximately one-third the payload capability, announced under the project name BFR, and subsequently renamed "Starship/Super Heavy" in 2018, and then sometimes just "Starship" by SpaceX in September 2019, but then "Starship and Super Heavy" once again in October 2019. The initial design objective of the ITS launch vehicle was to launch a variety of SpaceX Mars transportation infrastructure missions to Mars and other destinations in the beyond-Earth-orbit portion of the Solar System. The first launch was not expected before the 2020s.

The ITS launch vehicle was to be operated as a somewhat unusual two-stage rocket. Its first stage was to have been powered by 42 Raptor rocket engines—designed and manufactured by SpaceX—operating on densified (chilled near triple point) methane/oxygen, propellants that have not been widely used as rocket propellants in the past. Like the Falcon 9 orbital launch vehicle that preceded it, the ITS launch vehicle's first stage design was intended to be reusable, following a return to the launch site and vertical landing following each launch. When announced, it was also designed to have a new feature for SpaceX launch vehicles: full reusability of even the second-stage and orbital spacecraft as well. The large payload capacity of the launch vehicle placed it into the super-heavy lift class, with the ability to place 300 tonnes (660,000 lb) into low Earth orbit in reusable configuration and 550 tonnes (1,210,000 lb) in expendable mode.

The second stage of the Earth launch vehicle was planned to have two versions, the Interplanetary Spaceship for passengers and cargo and the ITS tanker to deliver propellants to Earth orbit. Both were to be powered by six vacuum-optimized Raptor rocket engines with three additional sea-level-nozzle Raptor engines for maneuvering. Thus, the element of the launch vehicle that was to provide second-stage acceleration to orbital velocity on all launches from Earth would also be used as an on-orbit spacecraft. The Interplanetary Spaceship was planned as a very long-duration carrier of both passengers and space cargo to interplanetary destinations, and was to have served as both a descent and ascent vehicle at Mars.

The high-level specifications for the vehicle were publicly announced in September 2016, but by July 2017, SpaceX had stated they would not build the 12 m (39 ft)-diameter vehicles as previously planned, but would instead build a "still large" but much smaller launch vehicle first. Subsequently, that was revealed to be the BFR in September 2017, a vehicle intended to cost-effectively replace and supersede all existing SpaceX launch vehicles and passenger/cargo spacecraft.

== History ==
The launch vehicle was initially mentioned in public discussions by Elon Musk in 2012 as part of SpaceX's description of its overall Mars system architecture, then known as the Mars Colonial Transporter (MCT). MCT was SpaceX's name for its privately funded development project to design and build a spaceflight system of reusable rocket engines, launch vehicles and space capsules to eventually transport humans to Mars and return them to Earth.

As early as 2007 however, Musk had stated a personal goal of eventually enabling human exploration and settlement of Mars. Bits of additional information about the mission architecture were released in 2011–2015, including a 2014 statement that initial colonists would arrive at Mars no earlier than the middle of the 2020s, and SpaceX began development of the large Raptor rocket engine for the Mars Colonial Transporter before 2014.

Musk stated in a 2011 interview that he hoped to send humans to Mars' surface within 10–20 years, and in late 2012 that he envisioned the first colonists arriving no earlier than the middle of the 2020s.

In October 2012, Musk first publicly articulated a high-level plan to build a second reusable rocket system with capabilities substantially beyond the Falcon 9/Falcon Heavy launch vehicles on which SpaceX had by then spent several billion US dollars. This new vehicle was to be "an evolution of SpaceX's Falcon 9 booster ... much bigger [than Falcon 9]." But Musk indicated that SpaceX would not be speaking publicly about it until 2013. In June 2013, Musk stated that he intended to hold off any potential IPO of SpaceX shares on the stock market until after the "Mars Colonial Transporter is flying regularly."

In February 2014, the principal payload for the MCT launch vehicle was announced to be a large interplanetary spacecraft named Mars Colonial Transporter, capable of carrying up to 100 tonnes (220,000 lb) of passengers and cargo. Musk stated that Mars Colonial Transporter will be "100 times the size of an SUV". According to SpaceX engine development head Tom Mueller, concept designs at the time indicated SpaceX could use nine Raptor engines on a single rocket, similar to the use of nine Merlin engines on each Falcon 9 booster core, in order "to put over 100 tons of cargo on Mars." At that time, it appeared that the large rocket core that would be used for the booster to be used with MCT would be at least 10 meters (33 ft) in diameter—nearly three times the diameter and over seven times the cross-sectional area of the Falcon 9 booster cores—and was expected to have up to three rocket cores with a total of at least 27 engines.

By August 2014, media sources speculated that the initial flight test of the Raptor-driven super-heavy launch vehicle could occur as early as 2020, in order to fully test the engines under orbital spaceflight conditions; however, any colonization effort was then reported to continue to be "deep into the future".

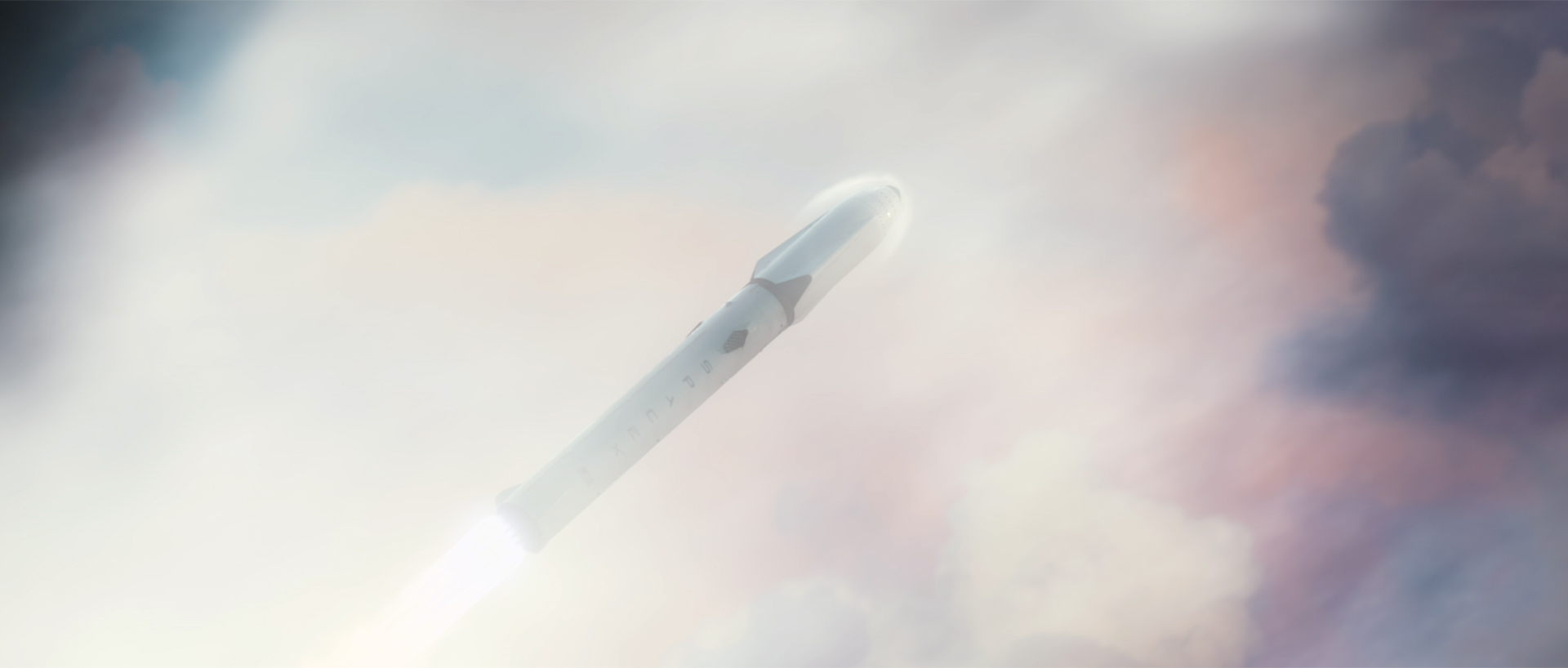
Rendering of an ITS on ascent

Previously, the launch vehicle was known informally as the BFR ("Big Falcon Rocket or Big Fucking Rocket"), a name coined by Musk personally in reference to the BFG 9000 from the 1993 video game Doom.

The spacecraft had a similar moniker: informally dubbed the BFS (for Big Fucking Spaceship), also coined by Musk.

SpaceX indicated in 2014 that there may be more than one design in a family of SpaceX super-heavy lift launch vehicles.

In January 2015, Musk said that he hoped to release details of the "completely new architecture" for the Mars transport system in late 2015 but those plans changed and, by the end of the year, the plan to publicly release additional specifics had moved to 2016.

Musk stated in June 2016 that the first unmanned MCT Mars flight could happen as early as for 2022, to be followed by the first manned MCT Mars flight departing as early as 2024. Company plans as of mid-2016 continued to call for the arrival of the first humans on Mars no earlier than 2025. As of 25 August 2016, the rocket had not yet been given a formal name by SpaceX, although Musk commented on a proposal on Twitter to name it "Millennium". In his September 2016 announcement, Musk referred to the vehicle components as the "interplanetary booster", the "interplanetary spaceship", and the "tanker". In mid-September 2016, Musk noted that the Mars Colonial Transporter name would not continue, as the system would be able to "go well beyond Mars", and that a new name would be needed. The name selected was Interplanetary Transport System (ITS)

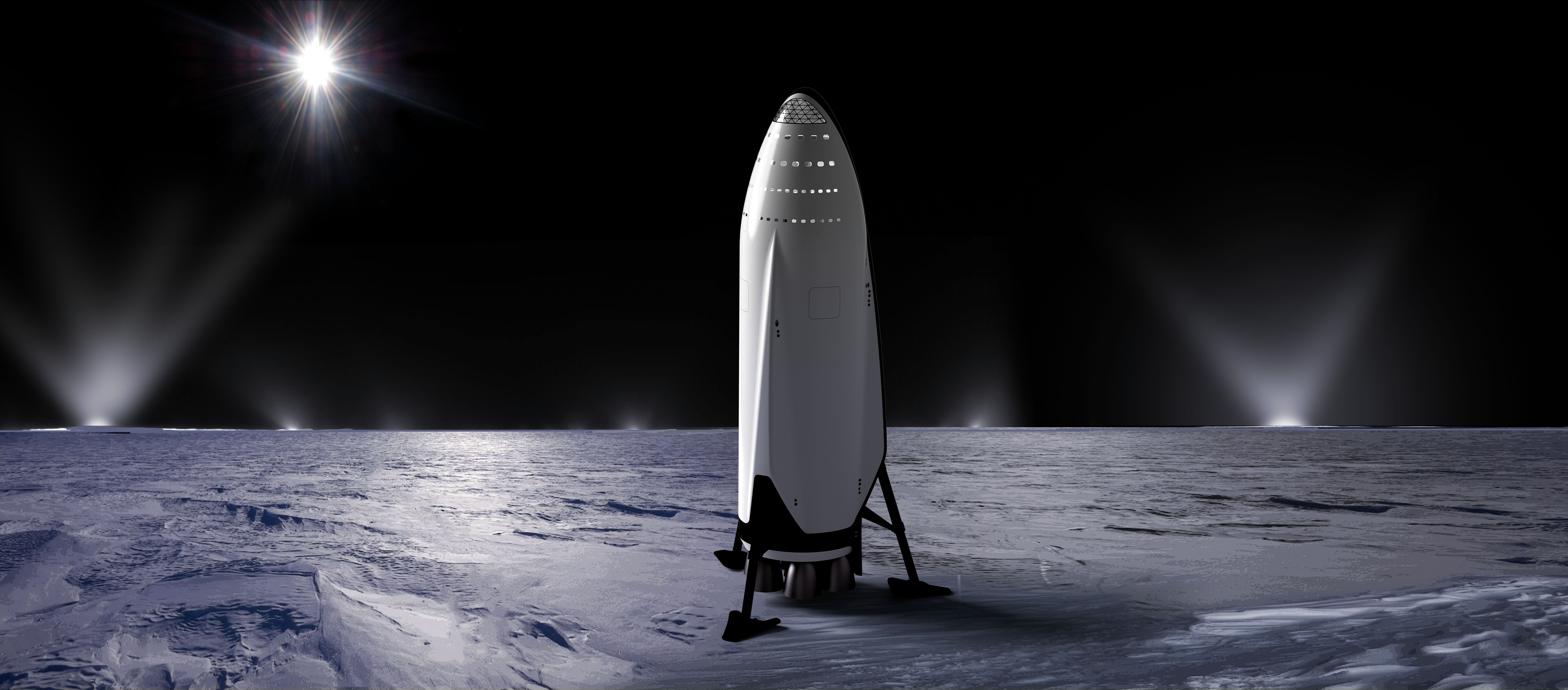
Artist's concept of the ITS Interplanetary Spaceship, landed on Saturn's moon Enceladus.

SpaceX CEO Musk unveiled details of the space mission architecture, launch vehicle, spacecraft, and Raptor engines that power the vehicles at the 67th International Astronautical Congress on September 27, 2016. The first firing of a Raptor engine occurred on a test stand in September 2016 as well.

In October 2016, Musk indicated that the initial prepreg carbon-fiber tank test article, built with no sealing liner, had performed well in initial cryogenic fluid testing, and that a pressure test of the tank at approximately 2/3 of the design burst pressure was slated for later in 2016, with the very large tank placed on an ocean barge for the test. This test was successfully completed in November 2016.

In July 2017, SpaceX made public plans to build a much smaller launch vehicle and spacecraft in lieu of building the ITS, and stated that the new system architecture had "evolved quite a bit" since the November 2016 articulation of the very large ITS launch vehicle. A key driver of the new architecture is to make the new system useful for substantial Earth-orbit and cislunar launches so that the new system might pay for itself, in part, through commercial spaceflight activities in the near-Earth space zone. In September 2017, the new smaller design was revealed to be the 9 m (30 ft) diameter launch vehicle, referred to by its "code name" BFR, with similar core vehicle structure (carbon fiber), engines (Raptor), and Mars mission architecture; but explicitly aimed at superseding and replacing the entire existing set of SpaceX launch vehicle and spacecraft offerings—Falcon 9, Falcon Heavy, and the Dragon spacecraft—with a more cost-effective LV, while being designed to be fully reusable like the ITS launch vehicle.

== Description and technical specifications ==
The ITS launch vehicle stack was composed of two stages. The first stage was always to be an interplanetary booster while the second stage would have been either an interplanetary spaceship (for beyond-Earth-orbit missions) or an ITS tanker (for on-orbit propellant transfer operations).

Both stages of the ITS launch vehicle were to be powered by Raptor bipropellant liquid rocket engines utilizing the full flow staged combustion cycle with liquid methane fuel and liquid oxygen oxidizer. Both propellants would be fully in the gas phase before entering the Raptor combustion chamber. Both stages were intended to utilize a bleed-off of the high-pressure gas for autogenous pressurization of the propellant tanks, eliminating the problematic high-pressure helium pressurization system used in the Falcon 9 launch vehicle. The self-pressurization gas system is a critical part of SpaceX strategy to reduce launch vehicle fluids from five in their legacy Falcon 9 vehicle family to just two, eliminating not only the helium tank pressurant but all hypergolic propellants as well as nitrogen for cold-gas reaction-control thrusters.

The overall launch vehicle height, first stage and the integrated second-stage/spacecraft, was 122 m (400 ft). Both stages of the ITS LV were to have been constructed of lightweight-yet-strong carbon fiber, even the deep-cryogenic propellant tanks, a major change from the aluminum-lithium alloy tank and structure material used in SpaceX Falcon 9 family of launch vehicles. Both stages are fully reusable and will land vertically, technology initially developed on the Falcon 9 launch vehicle first stages in 2012–2016. Gross liftoff mass is 10,500 tonnes (23,100,000 lb) at a lift-off thrust of 128 meganewtons (29,000,000 lbf). ITS LV would be able to carry a payload to low Earth orbit of 550 tonnes (1,210,000 lb) in expendable-mode and 300 tonnes (660,000 lb) in reusable mode.

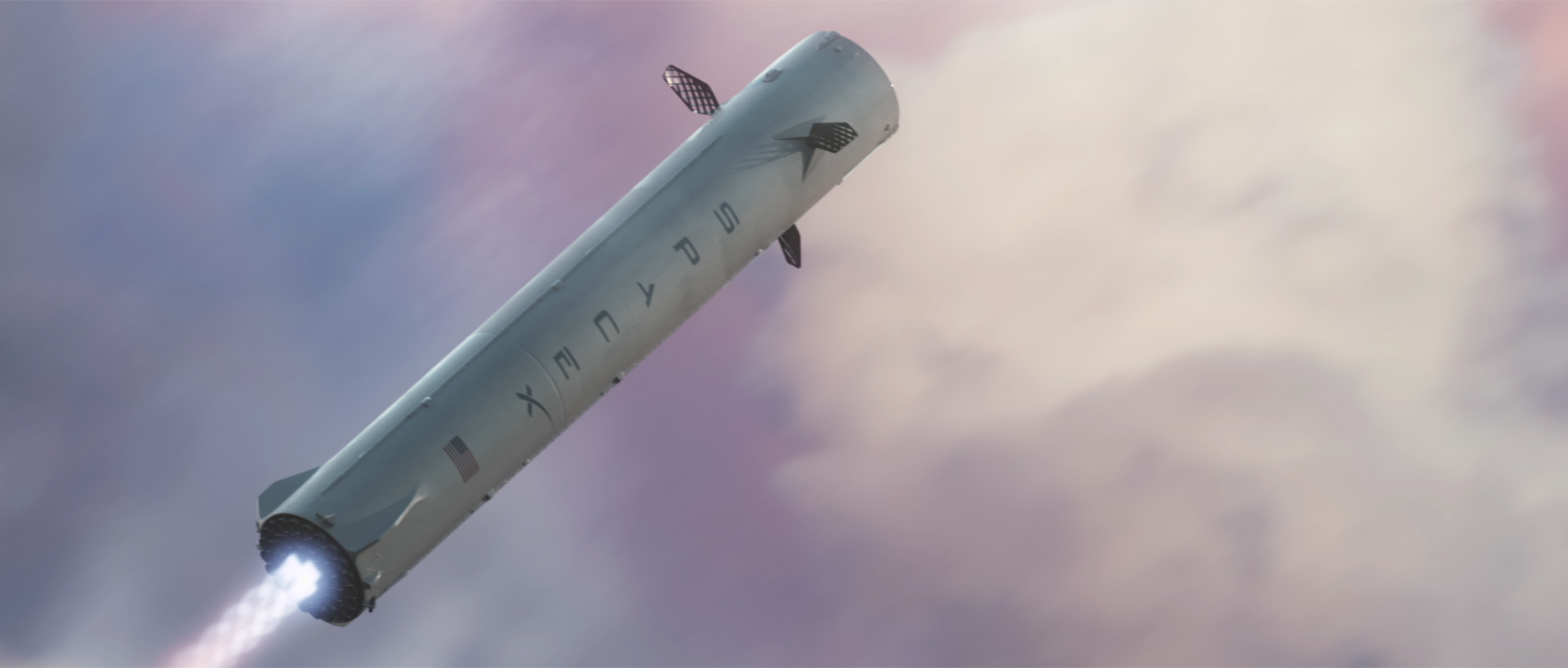
Rendering of the reusable ITS booster in descent

=== ITS booster ===
The first-stage ITS booster, or Interplanetary booster—was a 12 m (39 ft)-diameter, 77.5 m (254 ft)-high, reusable rocket to be powered by 42 sea-level rated Raptor engines producing some 3,024 kilonewtons (680,000 lbf) of thrust in each engine. Total booster thrust was to have been approximately 130 MN (29,000,000 lbf), several times the 36 MN (8,000,000 lbf) thrust of the Saturn V Moon mission launch vehicle.

The design engine configuration included 21 engines in an outer ring and 14 in an inner ring, with these 35 engines fixed in place. The center cluster of seven engines were to be gimbaled for directional control, although some directional control to the rocket is also available by utilizing differential thrust on the fixed engines. Design thrust on each engine was aiming to be variable between 20 and 100 percent of rated thrust.

Methane/oxygen would also be used to power the control thrusters, as gas thrusters rather than the subcooled liquid used to power the main engines. The methalox control thrusters would be used to control booster orientation in space, as well as to help provide additional accuracy in landing once the velocity of the descending booster has slowed.

The design was intended to use about seven percent of the total propellant load at launch in order to support the reusable aspect and bring the booster back to the launch pad for a vertical landing, assessment, and relaunch, assuming a separation velocity of approximately 8,650 km/h (2.40 km/s). The design called for grid fins to be used during atmospheric reentry, once the atmosphere is sufficiently dense, to control the attitude of the rocket and fine tune the landing location. The booster return flights were expected to encounter loads lower than those experienced on the Falcon 9 reentries, principally because the ITS LV would have both a lower mass ratio and a lower density than Falcon 9. The booster was to be designed for 20 G nominal loads, and possibly as high as 30–40 G's without breaking up.

In contrast to the landing approach used on SpaceX mid-2010s reusable rocket first stages—either a large, flat concrete pad or downrange floating landing platform used with Falcon 9 and Falcon Heavy—the ITS booster was to be designed to land on a launch mount itself, where it may then be refilled with propellant and checked out for follow-on flights.

=== Spacecraft that operate briefly as upper stages during launch ===
The ITS launch vehicle did not have a dedicated and single-function second stage in the way most launch vehicles have had. Instead, the upper stage function of gaining sufficient velocity to place a payload into Earth orbit is provided as a relatively short term role by a spacecraft that has all the requisite systems for long-duration spaceflight. This is not a role that most upper stages have had in launch vehicle designs through the 2010s, as typical upper stage on-orbit life is measured in hours. Previous exceptions to this norm exist, for example the Space Shuttle orbiter provided part of the boost energy and all of the second stage energy for lofting itself into low-Earth orbit. Differences also exist: the Space Shuttle expended its propellant tank and primary launch vehicle structure on ascent, whereas the ITS first- and second-stage options are designed to be fully reusable.

In the 2016 design, SpaceX had identified two spacecraft that would also play the upper stage role on each Earth-away launch: the interplanetary spaceship and the ITS tanker. Both spacecraft are the same physical external dimensions: 49.5 m (162 ft)-long and 12 m (39 ft)-diameter 17 m (56 ft) across at the widest point. Both designs were powered by six vacuum-optimized Raptor engines, each producing 3.5 MN (790,000 lbf) thrust, and were to have had three lower-expansion-ratio Raptor engines for in-space maneuvering as well as during descent and landing to allow for reuse on future launches.

==== Interplanetary spaceship ====
The Interplanetary spaceship was a large passenger-carrying spacecraft design proposed by SpaceX as part of their ITS launch vehicle in September 2016. The ship would operate as a second-stage of the orbital launch vehicle on Earth-ascents—and would also be the interplanetary transport vehicle for both cargo and passengers— capable of transporting up to 450 tonnes (990,000 lb) of cargo per trip to Mars following propellant-refill in Earth orbit.

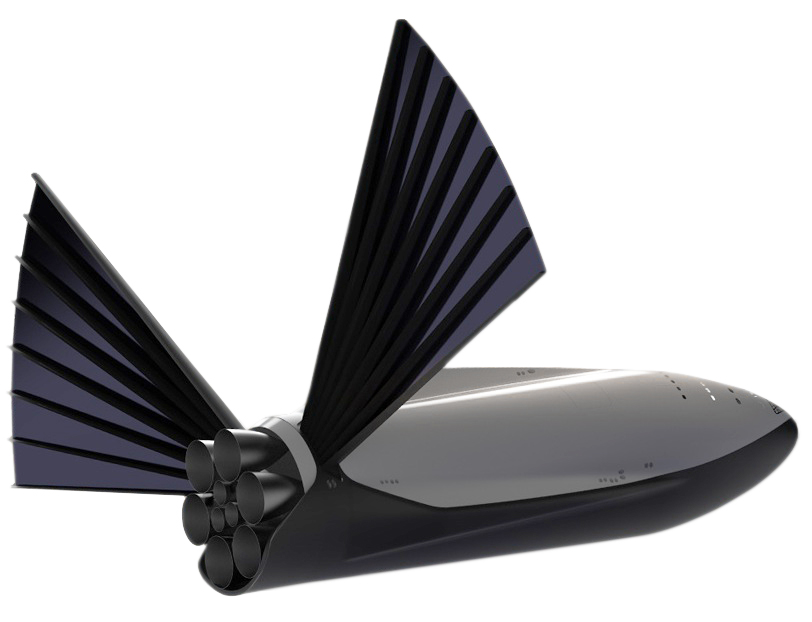
Back-quarter view of a rendering of the interplanetary spaceship from engineering drawings, with the solar panels extended.

In addition to use during maneuvering, descent and landing, the three lower-expansion-ratio Raptor engines were also to have been used for initial ascent from the surface of Mars. In 2016, the first test launch of a spaceship was not expected until 2020 or later, and the first flight of the ITS booster was expected to follow a year or more later.

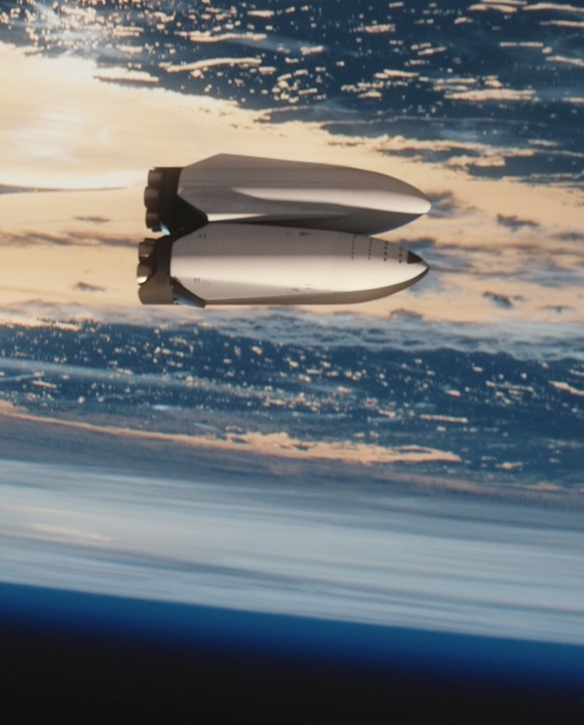
Rendering of an ITS tanker (top) transferring propellant to an interplanetary spaceship (bottom) in Earth orbit.

Early Mars flights—in the mid-2020s or later—were expected to carry mostly equipment and few people.

==== ITS tanker ====
The ITS tanker is a propellant tanker variant of the ITS second stage spacecraft. This spacecraft design was to be used exclusively for launch and short-term holding of propellants to be transported to low-Earth orbit. Once on orbit, a rendezvous operation was to have been effected with one of the interplanetary spaceships, plumbing connections made, while a maximum of 380 tonnes (840,000 lb) of liquid methane and liquid oxygen propellants would be transferred in one load to the spaceship. To fully fuel an interplanetary spaceship for a long-duration interplanetary flight, it was expected that up to five tankers would be required to launch from Earth, carrying and transferring a total of nearly 1,900 tonnes (4,200,000 lb) of propellant to fully load the spaceship for the journey.

Following completion of the on-orbit propellant offloading, the reusable tanker was to reenter the Earth's atmosphere, land, and be prepared for another tanker flight.

=== Reusability ===
Both stages were to be designed by SpaceX to be fully reusable and were to land vertically, using a set of technologies previously developed by SpaceX and tested in 2013–2016 on a variety of Falcon 9 test vehicles as well as actual Falcon 9 launch vehicles.

Importantly, the "fully and rapidly reusable" aspect of the ITS launch vehicle and spacecraft design was the largest factor in the SpaceX analysis for bringing down the currently huge cost of transporting mass to space, in general, and to interplanetary destinations, in particular. While the transport system under development in 2016-2017 relied on a combination of several elements to make long-duration beyond Earth orbit (BEO) spaceflights possible by reducing the cost per ton delivered to Mars, the reusability aspect of the launch and spacecraft vehicles alone was expected by SpaceX to reduce that cost by approximately 2 1/2 orders of magnitude over what NASA had previously achieved on similar missions. Musk stated that this is over half of the total 4 1/2 orders of magnitude reduction that he believes is needed to enable a sustainable settlement off Earth to emerge.

=== Launch location ===
When announced in September 2016, the targeted location for initial launches of the ITS launch vehicle was LC-39A, at SpaceX's leased pad at Launch pad 39A on the Florida coast, the same launchpad where Apollo 11 launched in 1969 to the Moon. Subsequent Apollo Missions were also launched from the pad.

== Operations concept ==
The concept of operations for ITS launches envisioned the fully loaded second-stage reaching orbit with only minimal propellant remaining in the interplanetary spaceship vehicle's tanks. Then, while the spaceship remained in Earth orbit, three to five cargo second stages—called ITS tankers—would be launched from Earth carrying additional methane fuel and liquid oxygen oxidizer to rendezvous with, and transfer propellant to, the outgoing spaceship. Once refueled, the spaceship was to perform a trans-Mars injection burn, departing Earth orbit for the interplanetary portion of the journey.

== Economic considerations ==
=== Funding ===
The development work on the new two-stage launch vehicle design was privately funded by SpaceX. The entire project is possible only as a result of SpaceX multi-faceted approach focusing on the reduction of launch costs.

The full build-out of the Mars colonialization plans was envisioned by Musk in 2016 to be funded by both private and public funds. The speed of commercially available Mars transport for both cargo and humans will be driven, in large part, by market demand as well as constrained by the technology development and development funding.

Elon Musk said that there is no expectation of receiving NASA contracts for any of the ITS system work SpaceX was doing. He also indicated that such contracts, if received, would be good.

=== Competition for the American super-heavy-lift market ===
In August 2014, media sources noted that the US launch market might have two competitive launch vehicles available in the 2020s to launch payloads of 100 tonnes (220,000 lb) or more to low Earth orbit. The US government is currently developing the Space Launch System (SLS), a super heavy-lift launch vehicle designed to propel very large payloads of 70 to 130 tonnes (150,000 to 290,000 lb) to low Earth orbit.

Blue Origin's New Glenn rocket, announced in September 2016, is also expected to compete in the super-heavy lift class. In March 2017, New Glenn's reusable payload capacity was announced as 45 tonnes to LEO and 13 tonnes to GTO.

== See also ==
- SpaceX Starship design history
- Mars to Stay
- The High Frontier: Human Colonies in Space
- Human spaceflight
- Space exploration
- Space Colonization
- Colonization of Mars
- Colonization of the outer Solar System
- Sea Dragon (rocket)
- Otrag (rocket)
