= History of SpaceX =

History of a space corporation

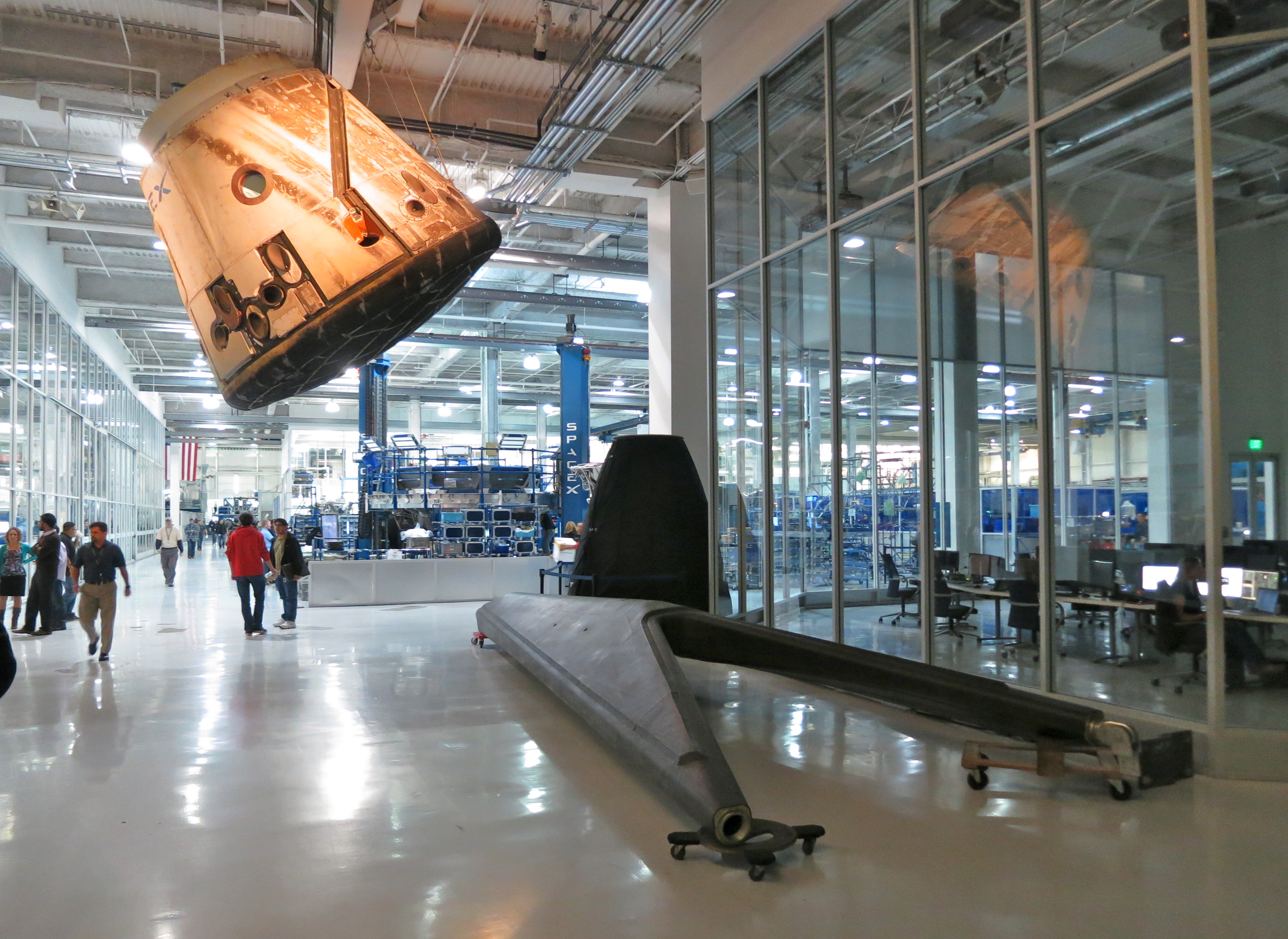
Entry to SpaceX's headquarters, showing the Dragon capsule used in the COTS Demo Flight 1, a Falcon 9's landing leg and the glassy control room

This is a corporate history of SpaceX, an American aerospace manufacturer and space transport services company founded by Elon Musk.

== Musk's personal ventures and founding ==
After being ousted as the CEO of PayPal in late 2000, Elon Musk started to gain an interest in space exploration ventures. This spark of interest, according to Musk, came when he was being asked by his friend entrepreneur Adeo Ressi about his plan for the future after PayPal. Musk looked up at NASA's website and was surprised that NASA did not have any concrete plan for a human mission to Mars. He then began to attend space conferences and provided funding for private space projects, which include The Planetary Society's solar sail and the Ansari X Prize crewed spaceflight competition. Musk also pledged US $100,000 to the Mars Society and was invited to be in its board of directors. As early as August 2001, in contemporary sources, Musk has publicly expressed his support for making humans an interplanetary species at the Mars Society's annual convention. The same month, Musk resigned from his position at Mars Society.

According to Robert Zubrin, Mars Society's founder, he provided Musk contact to aerospace engineer Jim Cantrell as a technical adviser for the society's Mars Gravity Biosatellite project. From there, Musk, Cantrell, along with a few other engineers worked on Mars Oasis, a project that aimed to grow a plant in Martian soil as a publicity stunt for garnering interest to Mars missions. Mars Oasis project is independent from the Mars Society. Musk and his team travelled twice to Russia, once in October 2001 and another in February 2002 with Michael D. Griffin, to obtain a refurbished intercontinental ballistic missile to launch Mars Oasis. Both attempts failed – the missiles were outrageously priced by the ISC Kosmotras at $8 million per missile when queried, and the team was concerned that the price would go up even higher after the deal had been finalized. Reportedly, this is because Musk and his team were not regarded highly by the Russians.

After the second failed attempt to procure a missile, the Mars Oasis plan was abandoned and Musk pondered the feasibility of building a rocket himself. As he learned more about the United States space industry, in retrospect, Musk realized that the Mars Oasis mission would more likely lead to an unsustainable Mars program, similar to how the Apollo program operated. According to Musk, the crucial component for a sustainable Mars program is a low launch cost.

In early 2002, with that realization, Musk met with aerospace engineers at a hotel in Los Angeles International Airport to discuss founding a space launch company, with reportedly some having scoffed at the idea. In April, from that group he invited five that could join the company as early employees: Michael Griffin, Jim Cantrell, John Garvey, Tom Mueller, and Chris Thompson. Griffin, Cantrell and Garvey declined the invitation, while Mueller and Thompson became the company's first and second employee respectively. Musk provided half of his $180 million from PayPal stocks to the newly founded company securing both employees with two-years' worth of salary. The company was named "Space Exploration Technologies Corporation", originally with "S.E.T." as a shortened name, but it was quickly changed to be "SpaceX". According to filings, SpaceX was incorporated on March 14, 2002, but according to various sources SpaceX's de facto founding date might instead be May 6 or around June.

== Falcon 1 ==
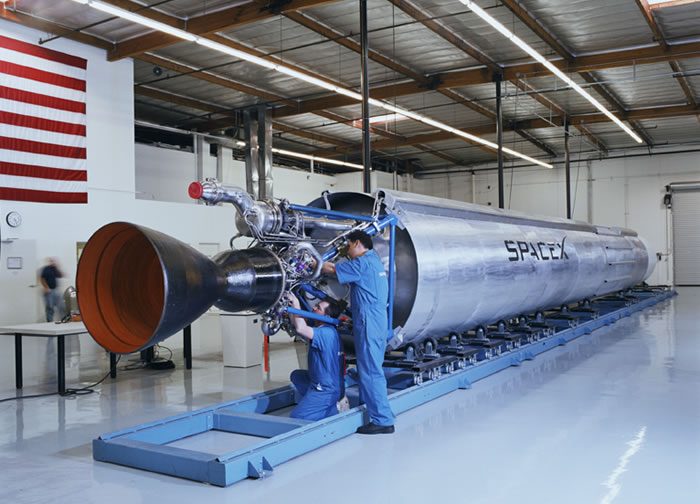
Construction of the Falcon 1

Musk assumed the role of Chief Engineer, after having offered the title to Griffin who did not join SpaceX. Mueller was in charge of developing rocket engines, propellant tanks and plumbing; Thompson was in charge of making the rocket's body and couplings. Hans Koenigsmann, who was recommended by Thompson and had met Musk a few months earlier, joined SpaceX and was in charge of making the rocket's avionics (electronic systems). In August 2002, Gwynne Shotwell was hired as the head of sales for the company.

At first, SpaceX's employees would meet at hotels in airports, but later the company headquartered at a building in 1310 East Grand Avenue, El Segundo, California. The building was 3,000 ft^{2} (280 m^{2}), which at the time housed only a few cubicles and fewer than a dozen employees. The company at the time was under a flat hierarchy, so employees (including Musk) could freely switch roles and do other person's tasks if needed. Musk personally interviewed the first three thousand employees, most were college graduates (because they do not have family attachments), and pushed them to work long hours at their highest effort.

SpaceX's first rocket was named Falcon 1 by Musk, taking inspiration from the Millennium Falcon from Star Wars after their early contract for the DARPA Falcon Project. Falcon 1 was designed with a core tenet of low launch cost; according to contemporary sources the rocket has an advertised price of $6 million per launch. This is the reason SpaceX implemented tight vertical integration for manufacturing rocket parts. Unlike most aerospace companies at the time, the Falcon 1 was developed in an iterative and incremental process instead of the waterfall process. Musk was being extremely optimistic about the launch schedule; he wanted to launch Falcon 1 by the end of 2003, but late December 2005 would be when the rocket was first ready for flight. A mockup for the rocket was first officially unveiled to the public and the government at the National Mall, Washington, D.C. on December 8, 2003.

=== Merlin and Kestrel engine ===
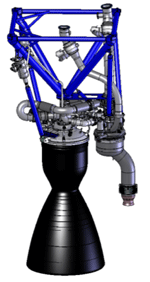
Merlin

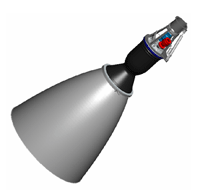
Kestrel

CAD models of Falcon 1 engines

The Falcon 1's first stage needed a rocket engine that produces about 310,000 N (70,000 lbf) of thrust and used a kerosene–liquid oxygen propellant combination. However, because Mueller had little experience at building a turbopump for the engine, he initially outsourced the turbopump from NASA's Fastrac engine. The one- or two-year long procurement process was too long for SpaceX, so the company contracted the manufacturer directly (named Barber-Nichols) to build Fastrac's turbopump. Later, a Barber-Nichols employee suggested that the engine should be named for a type of falcon bird, because the rocket itself is named 'Falcon 1'. Mueller called the first stage engine "Merlin" after a medium-sized falcon and the second stage engine "Kestrel" after the small falcon.

SpaceX also needed a test site for the Merlin and Kestrel engines. In 2002, the company rented a space at the Mojave Air and Space Port to test the turbopumps, but soon SpaceX ran into issues with the testing facility: one time, black sooty clouds from the turbopump enveloped the air traffic control tower. A bigger and more lax testing facility was needed, especially because the Mojave Spaceport only allows testing of engines that have less than one-half the thrust of the Merlin engine. SpaceX finally chose a testing site at McGregor, Texas that was previously owned by the bankrupted Beal Aerospace. To save time, employees from the California headquarters would fly there on Musk's private jet. At 9:50 P.M., March 11, 2003, the Merlin engine completed its first ever full firing with a duration of about half a second, achieving a thrust of 270,000 N (60,000 lbf) and 93% combustion efficiency.

=== Launch site preparations ===
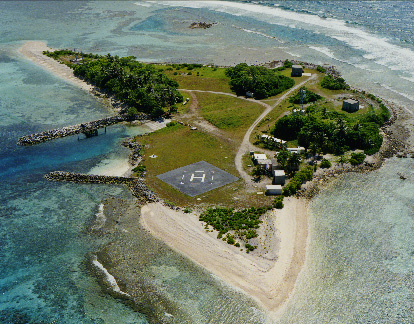
Omelek Island, around 2005

Initially, SpaceX planned to launch the Falcon 1 at Vandenberg Air Force Base due to its close proximity to the company's headquarters. The Vandenberg Space Launch Complex 3 was licensed to the company in early 2004, and SpaceX employees began the construction of supporting facilities around the launch complex. By early 2005, the first Falcon 1 arrived to the launch site via a flatbed truck. In the first week of May 2005, SpaceX tried to perform its first static fire attempt, but after many aborts and recycling due to software bugs and bad instruments, its liquid oxygen supply ran out and the test was cancelled for the day. The second static fire attempt a few weeks later, was also cancelled for the same reason, but the third static fire attempt on May 27 was a success.

However, since early 2003, when the Malaysian government contacted SpaceX for launching RazakSAT into a near-equatorial orbit, SpaceX knew that Vandenberg was not an ideal launch site. To get to that orbit from California, the rocket needs to go east and into the continental United States, which is not allowed for safety. The then-current version of the Falcon 1 also needed to borrow velocity from the Earth's rotation to launch RazakSAT, meaning that a suitable launch site would be near the equator. So, after the deal was signed for $7 million, SpaceX selected Omelek Island, Kwajalein Atoll as the place for launching the satellite. Plans for launching Falcon 1 at Vandenburg were foiled when the Air Force kept delaying giving clearance for SpaceX's launch, citing the impending Titan IV launch of a reconnaissance satellite. SpaceX had to abandon $7 million worth of equipment at Vandenberg.

It was reasoned that waiting until the Titan IV launch or suing the Air Force would not be ideal for the company. In retrospect, Musk commented: "Technically, we weren't kicked out of Vandenberg, we were just put on ice. The Air Force never said no, but they never said yes. This went on for six months. The resources were draining out of the company. Effectively, it was just like being starved."

So, in June 2005, construction of the Omelek launch site begin. Aside from a small concrete bunker, everything else was brought in from the mainland or built from scratch: concrete launch pad, rocket hangar, electric generators, communications, etc. By September, most of the launch site was finished and more than 30 t (66,000 lb) of equipment were shipped by sea or air. The first stage of Falcon 1 came in September and the second stage came a month later; they were assembled and carried to the launch site using a wheeled strongback, rolling on top of pieces of plywood. One day before the first attempted Falcon 1 launch, due to frustration and intense pressure, the employees on Omelek went on strike; this was quickly resolved by a supply drop of chicken wings and cigarettes.

=== First, second and third failed launches ===
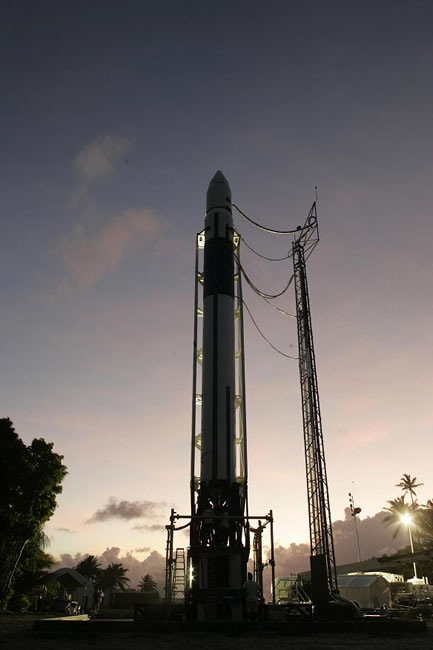
Prelaunch preparation of the Falcon 1, on November 26, 2005

Originally, TacSat-1 was going to be the payload for the maiden Falcon 1 launch, but eventually the FalconSAT-2 satellite from the United States Air Force Academy was chosen instead. The static fire test before the launch on November 26, 2005 was postponed due to a helium and oxygen leak by a faulty valve, and the attempted launch on December 20 was also cancelled due to the bad weather. Thompson, who was supervising the launch, found that the Falcon 1 first stage had buckled and was mere seconds away from a violent implosion. This was again caused by a faulty valve that did not open during propellant detanking.

The following year, a new first stage was shipped to Omelek. After the rocket was assembled, on February 6, the second stage's avionics short circuited and almost lead to the launch's months-long delay, if not for the quickly obtained capacitor from the mainland. The maiden launch of Falcon 1 happened on March 24, 2006, at 22:30 UTC, at which a fire damaged the rocket's pressurization system and cause the Merlin engine to flame off at T+29 seconds. The next morning, SpaceX employees and civilians from the atoll cleaned up the rocket's debris and eventually found FalconSAT-2 lying inside a machine shop.

== Overview ==
On August 4, 2008, SpaceX accepted a further $20 million investment from Founders Fund. In early 2012, approximately two-thirds of the company was owned by its founder and his 70 million shares were then estimated to be worth $875 million on private markets, which roughly valued SpaceX at $1.3 billion as of February 2012. After the COTS 2+ flight in May 2012, the company private equity valuation nearly doubled to $2.4 billion.

On June 16, 2009, SpaceX announced the opening of its Astronaut Safety and Mission Assurance Department. It hired former NASA astronaut Ken Bowersox to oversee the department as a vice president of the company. However, it has since been reported that the former astronaut subsequently left SpaceX in late 2011. No reason was given and no replacement in that position was announced.

In 2012, SpaceX advertised a launch price of $57 million on Falcon 9, while Arianespace was advertising a launch price of $137 million per launch.

In 2012, an initial public offering (IPO) was perceived as possible by the end of 2013, but then Musk stated in June 2013 that he planned to hold off any potential IPO until after the "Mars Colonial Transporter is flying regularly", and this was reiterated in 2015 indicating that it would be many years before SpaceX would become a publicly traded company, where Musk stated that "I just don't want [SpaceX] to be controlled by some private equity firm that would milk it for near-term revenue." The Mars Colonial Transporter project later evolved into the Interplanetary Transport System, then the Big Falcon Rocket, and finally the SpaceX Starship, whose full stack was first tested in 2023.

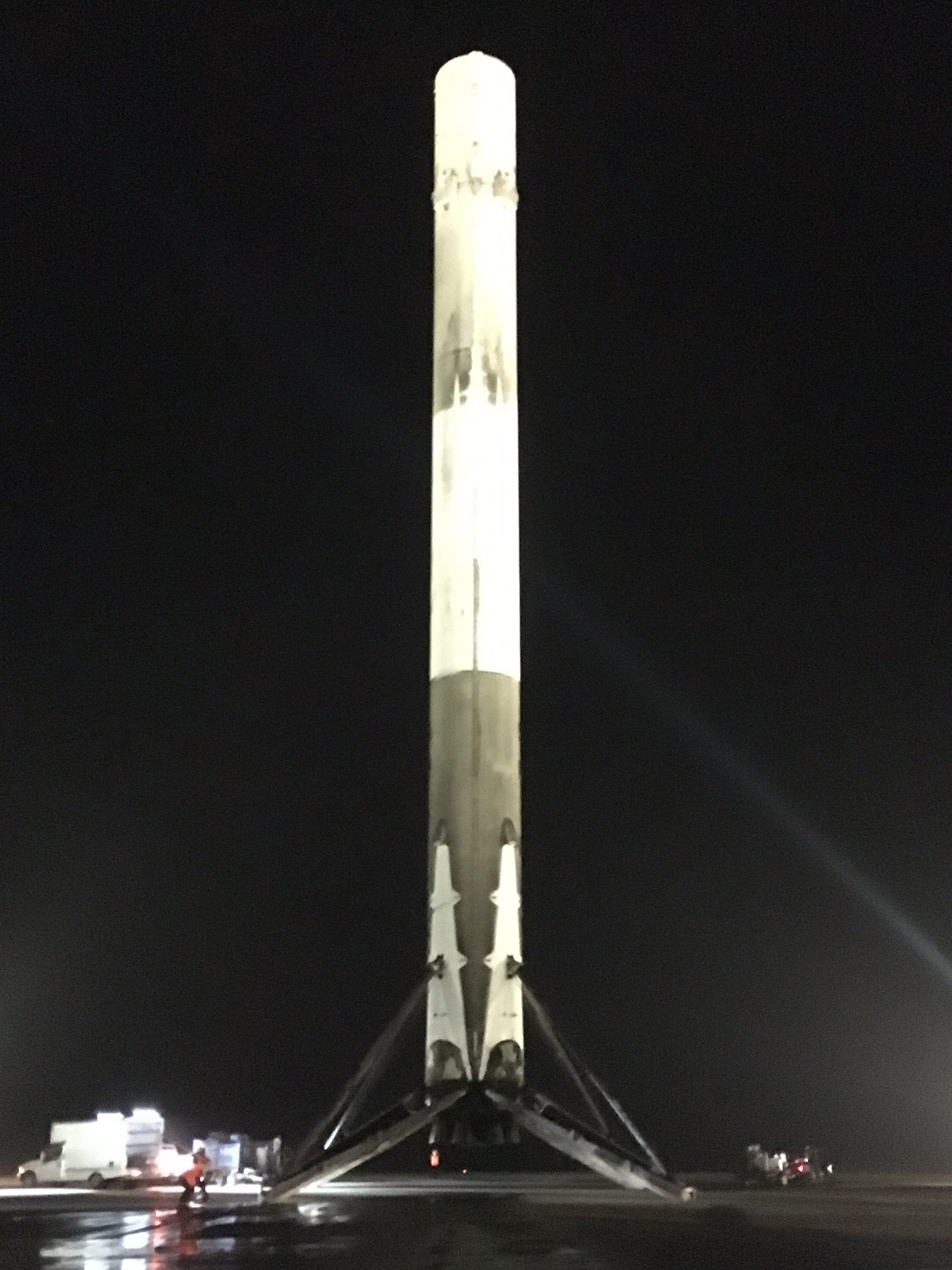
Falcon 9 rocket's first stage on the landing pad after the first successful vertical landing of an orbital rocket stage.

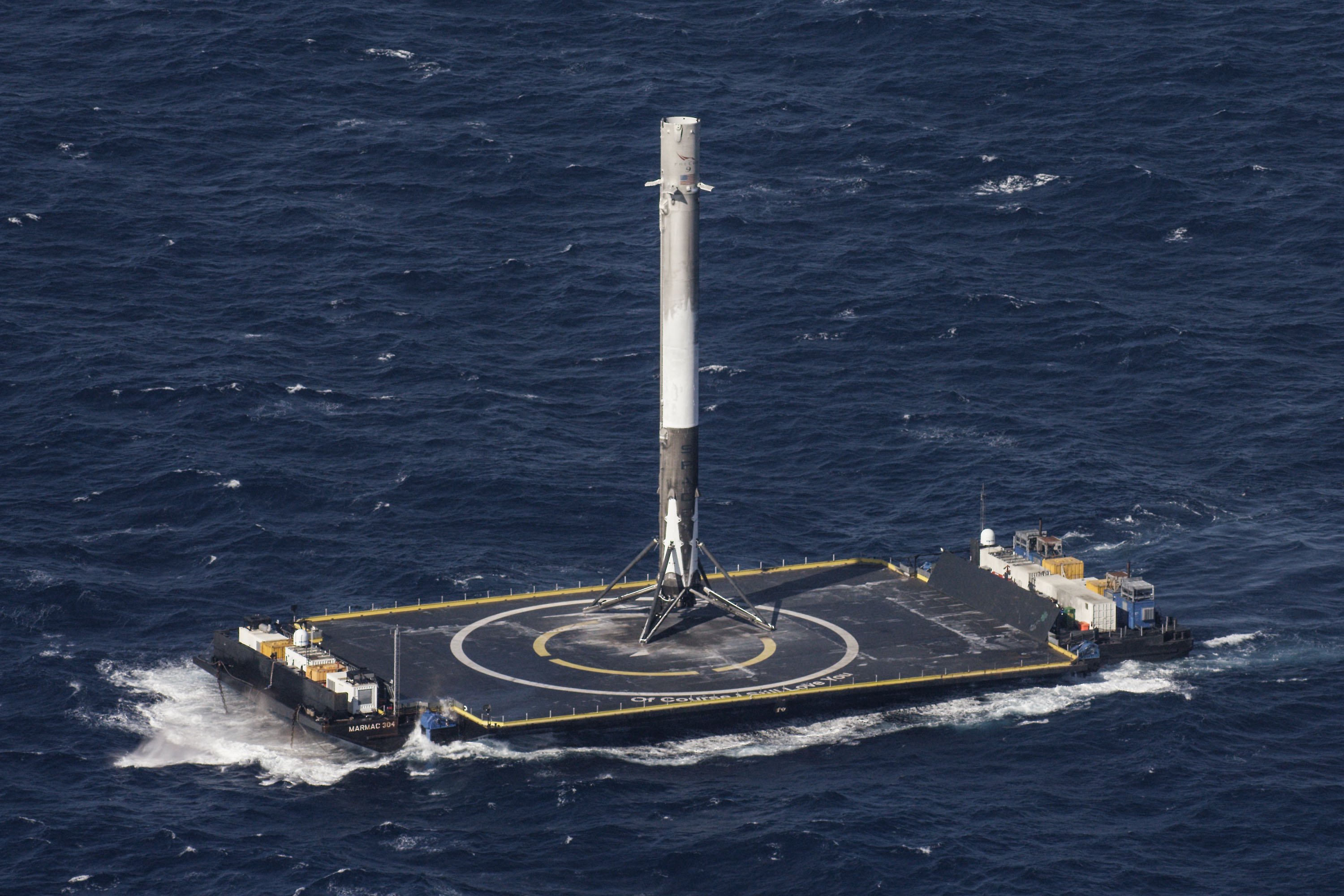
Falcon 9 first stage on an ASDS barge after the first successful landing at sea.

The company has grown rapidly since it was founded, growing from 160 employees in November 2005 to more than 500 by July 2008, to over 1,100 in 2010, 1,800 in early 2012, and 3,000 by early 2013. The company had grown to 3,800 employees and contractors by October 2013, and had "nearly 5,000" in late 2015 and February 2016.

After the setback of a launchpad explosion, SpaceX got back to flying on January 14, 2017, with its launch of Iridium satellites. On February 19, 2017, a Falcon 9 carrying CRS-10 conducted the first launch from Kennedy Space Center's Launch Complex 39A. The first stage of the launch was planned for the end of February 2017, was to be the recovered and refurbished one from April 8, 2016.

On May 23, 2019, SpaceX deployed the first 60 of around 12,000 satellites in its planned Starlink satellite system – which it aimed to use to provide low latency network communications via a large constellation in low Earth orbit (LEO).

On May 30, 2020, SpaceX launched two NASA astronauts (Douglas Hurley and Robert Behnken) into orbit on a Crew Dragon spacecraft during SpaceX Demo-2, making SpaceX the first private company to send astronauts to the International Space Station (ISS) and marking the first crewed launch from American soil in 9 years. The mission launched from Launch Complex 39A of the Kennedy Space Center in Florida. SpaceX Demo-2 successfully docked with the ISS on May 31, 2020 and returned the astronauts safely on August 2, 2020.

In 2025, residents of Boca Chica Village, Texas, the home of SpaceX's Starbase private launch site, voted to incorporate themselves into a new city, dubbed Starbase, Texas.

== Goals ==
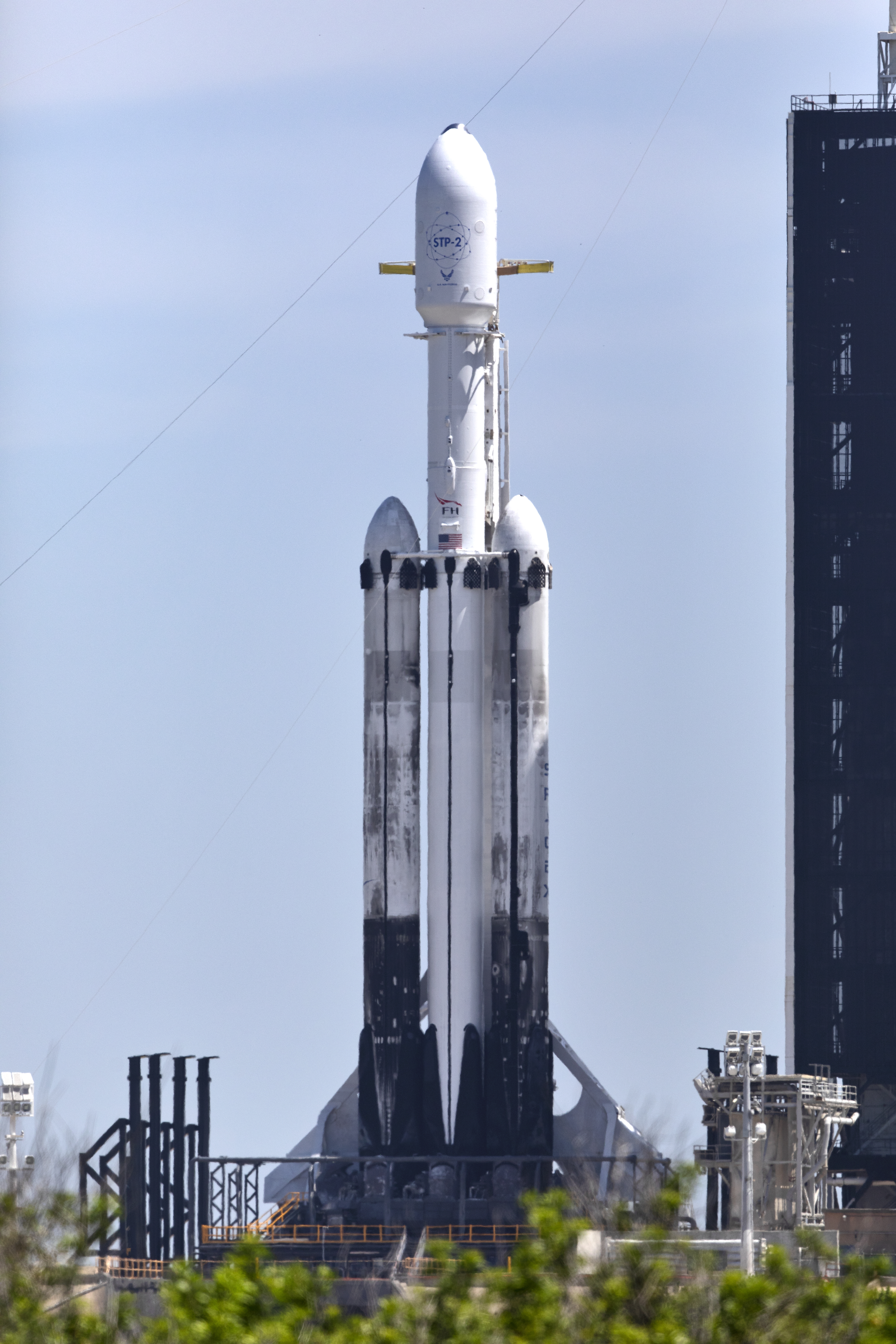
The third Falcon Heavy awaiting launch at Kennedy Space Center, June 2019

Musk has stated that one of his goals is to improve the cost and reliability of access to space, ultimately by a factor of ten. In 2004, the company plans called for "development of a heavy lift product and even a super-heavy, if there is customer demand", with each size increase resulting in a significant decrease in cost per pound to orbit. Musk said: "I believe $500 per pound ($1,100/kg) or less is very achievable."

A major goal of SpaceX has been to develop a rapidly reusable launch system. As of March 2013, including a test program of the low-altitude, low-speed Grasshopper vertical takeoff, vertical landing (VTVL) technology demonstrator rocket, and a high-altitude, high-speed Falcon 9 post-mission booster return test campaign where—beginning in mid-2013, with the sixth overall flight of Falcon 9—every first stage will be instrumented and equipped as a controlled descent test vehicle to accomplish propulsive-return over-water tests. SpaceX COO Gwynne Shotwell said at the Singapore Satellite Industry Forum in summer 2013 "If we get this [reusable technology] right, and we're trying very hard to get this right, we're looking at launches to be in the US$5 to 7 million range, which would really change things dramatically."

Musk stated in a 2011 interview, that he hopes to send humans to Mars' surface within 10–20 years. In 2010, Musk's calculations convinced him that the colonization of Mars was possible. In June 2013, Musk used the descriptor Mars Colonial Transporter to refer to the privately funded development project to design and build a spaceflight system of rocket engines, launch vehicles and space capsules to transport humans to Mars and return to Earth. In March 2014, COO Gwynne Shotwell said that once the Falcon Heavy and Dragon 2 crew version are flying, the focus for the company engineering team will be on developing the technology to support the transport infrastructure necessary for Mars missions. The project evolved into the Interplanetary Transport System, then the Big Falcon Rocket, and finally the SpaceX Starship.

In August 2020, SpaceX indicated it was looking to build a resort in South Texas with the intent to turn "Boca Chica into a '21st century Spaceport'". This complex, known as the SpaceX Starbase, has become the main hub for development of Starship. Work has continued steadily at the location, but the FAA and SpaceX have faced a number of legal challenges from environmental advocacy groups regarding threats to wildlife along with other complaints.

== Achievements ==
Major achievements of SpaceX include:

- The first privately funded, liquid-fueled rocket (Falcon 1) to reach orbit (September 28, 2008)
- The first privately funded company to successfully launch (by Falcon 9), orbit and recover a spacecraft (Dragon) (December 9, 2010)
- The first private company to send a spacecraft (Dragon) to the International Space Station (May 25, 2012)
- The first private company to send a satellite into geosynchronous orbit (SES-8, December 3, 2013)
- The first private company to send a probe beyond Earth orbit (Deep Space Climate Observatory, February 11, 2015)
- The first landing of a first stage orbital capable rocket (Falcon 9, Flight 20) (22 December 2015 1:39 UTC)
- The first water landing of a first stage orbital capable rocket (Falcon 9) (8 April 2016 20:53 UTC)
- The development of the most powerful operational rocket as of 2020 (Falcon Heavy, first flight February 6, 2018)
- The first private company to send humans into orbit (Crew Dragon Demo-2, May 30, 2020)
- Most orbital launches of a single rocket model without failure (120 Falcon 9 launches, April 21, 2022)
- The tallest, most powerful, and most massive rocket to ever launch (Starship first test flight, April 20, 2023)

== Setbacks ==
On March 1, 2013, a Dragon spacecraft in orbit developed problems with its thrusters. Due to blocked fuel valves, the craft was unable to properly control itself. SpaceX engineers were able to remotely clear the blockages. Because of this, it arrived at the International Space Station one day later than expected. Since spacecraft like the Dragon were classified as munitions, and considered weapons under arms regulations until November 2014, SpaceX Mission controllers were unable to release more information to the public.

On June 28, 2015 CRS-7 launched a Falcon 9 carrying an unmanned Dragon capsule intended to take supplies to the International Space Station. 2 minutes and 19 seconds into the flight a cloud of vapor was seen by the tracking camera forming outside the craft. A few seconds afterward there was a loss of pressure in the helium tank, after which they exploded, causing a complete failure of the mission. The software was not programmed to deploy the parachute for the Dragon capsule after a launch mishap, therefore the Dragon broke upon impact. The problem was discovered to be a failed 2 ft (61 cm) steel strut, purchased from a supplier, on a helium pressure vessel, which broke due to the force of acceleration. This caused a breach and allowed helium to escape causing the loss of the spacecraft, which exploded. The software issue was also fixed; in addition, an analysis of the entire program was carried out in order to ensure proper abort mechanisms are in place for future rockets and their payload. SpaceX President Gwynne Shotwell stated that in terms of the differences between the six previous successful Falcon 9 Commercial Resupply Launches, "there's nothing that stands out as being different for any particular flight." Though the craft was set to bring a resupply of food and water to the ISS, the crew members had enough supplies to last another 4 months before another resupply, which would end up being the Russian Progress 60P vehicle. Student science experiments, as well as a docking adapter and other miscellaneous cargo, were lost due to the CRS-7 failure as well.

On September 1, 2016, a Falcon 9 Full Thrust launch vehicle exploded during a propellant fill operation for a standard pre-launch static fire test at Cape Canaveral Launch Complex 40. There were no reported injuries, as the area was cleared for the test. However the payload, the Spacecom AMOS-6 communications satellite valued at $200 million, was destroyed. Spacecom claims its contract, since the launch failed, allows it to choose to receive $50 million or a future flight at no cost. Musk described the event as the "most difficult and complex failure" in SpaceX's 14-year history; SpaceX reviewed nearly 3,000 channels of telemetry and video data covering a period of 35–55 milliseconds for the postmortem. In late September, SpaceX stated that interim results suggested that a major breach of the cryogenic helium system of the second stage rocket had occurred. In November 2016, Musk reported the explosion was caused by the liquid oxygen used as the oxidizer turning so cold that it became a solid, and it may have breached the helium pressure vessels which are immersed in liquid oxygen. The vessels are overwrapped with a carbon composite material. The solid oxygen, under pressure, could have ignited with the carbon material causing the explosion. SpaceX concluded its investigation on January 2, 2017, then restarted its business of launching rockets in January 2017.

On April 20, 2023, the SpaceX Starship orbital test flight ended in failure, and the rocket's flight termination system was activated four minutes into the flight.

Successful SpaceX launches by year View source data.

== Funding ==
SpaceX is privately funded. SpaceX developed its first launch vehicle—Falcon 1—and three rocket engines—Merlin, Kestrel, and Draco—completely with private capital. SpaceX contracted with the US government for a portion of the development funding for the Falcon 9 launch vehicle, which uses a modified version of the Merlin rocket engine. SpaceX developed the Falcon Heavy launch vehicle, the Raptor methane-fueled rocket engine, and a set of reusable launch vehicle technologies with private capital.

As of May 2012, SpaceX had operated on total funding of approximately $1 billion in its first ten years of operation. Of this, private equity provided about $200M, with Musk investing approximately $100M and other investors having put in about $100M (Founders Fund, Draper Fisher Jurvetson, ...). The remainder has come from progress payments on long-term launch contracts and development contracts. As of April 2012, NASA had put in about $400–500 million of this amount, with most of that as progress payments on launch contracts. By May 2012, SpaceX had contracts for 40 launch missions, and each of those contracts provide down payments at contract signing, plus many are paying progress payments as launch vehicle components are built in advance of mission launch, driven in part by United States accounting rules for recognizing long-term revenue.

In August 2012, SpaceX signed a large development contract with NASA to design and develop a crew-carrying space capsule for the "next generation of U.S. human spaceflight capabilities", in order to re-enable the launch of astronauts from U.S. soil by 2017. Two other companies, Boeing and Sierra Nevada Corporation, received similar development contracts. Advances made by all three companies under Space Act Agreements through NASA's Commercial Crew Integrated Capability (CCiCap) initiative are intended to ultimately lead to the availability of commercial human spaceflight services for both government and commercial customers. As part of this agreement, SpaceX was awarded a contract worth up to $440 million for contract deliverables between 2012 and May 2014.

At the end of 2012, SpaceX had over 40 launches on its manifest, representing about $4 billion in contract revenue. Many of those contracts were already making progress payments to SpaceX, with both commercial and government (NASA/DOD) customers.As of December 2013, SpaceX had a total of 50 future launches under contract, two-thirds of them were for commercial customers. In late 2013, space industry media began to comment on the phenomenon that SpaceX prices are undercutting the major competitors in the commercial commsat launch market—the Ariane 5 and Proton-M—at which time SpaceX had at least 10 further geostationary orbit flights on its books.

In January 2015, SpaceX raised $1 billion in funding from Google and Fidelity Investments, in exchange for 8.333% of the company, establishing the company valuation at approximately $12 billion. Google and Fidelity joined the then current investorship group of Draper Fisher Jurvetson, Founders Fund, Valor Equity Partners and Capricorn. Although the investment was thought to be related to SpaceX's launch of a Starlink constellation effort, Gwynne Shotwell said in March 2015 that the investment was not specifically for the global internet project. Google had been searching for a satellite internet partner since the split with O3b Networks and OneWeb.

In 2020, Abu Dhabi-based IHC or International Holding Group bought 94% stakes in a private equity fund namely, Falcon CI IV LP, which had invested in SpaceX. Following the purchase of stakes, SpaceX completed $850 million worth of equity funding round, taking the total value of the company to nearly $74 billion in March 2021. On the other hand, the stock price of IHC also surged 75%, as of April 2021. IHC is led by Sheikh Tahnoon bin Zayed al-Nahyan as the President of the company, who also heads IHC's shareholder, Royal Group. Sheikh Tahnoon, who is the National Security Adviser of UAE also heads several other Abu Dhabi-based ventures including the International Golden Group, which has ties to the Libyan and Yemeni civil war.

== Summary of milestones ==
Date	Achievement	Flight
September 28, 2008	First privately funded, fully liquid-fueled rocket to reach orbit.	Falcon 1 Flight 4
July 14, 2009	First privately funded, fully liquid-fueled rocket to put a commercial satellite in orbit.	Falcon 1 Flight 5
December 9, 2010	First private company to successfully launch, orbit, and recover a spacecraft.	SpaceX COTS Demo Flight 1
May 25, 2012	First private company to send a spacecraft to the International Space Station (ISS).	SpaceX COTS Demo Flight 2
December 22, 2015	First landing of an orbital-class rocket's first stage on land.	Falcon 9 Flight 20
April 8, 2016	First landing of an orbital-class rocket's first stage on an ocean platform.	SpaceX CRS-8
March 30, 2017	First reuse and (second) landing of an orbital first stage.	SES-10
March 30, 2017	First controlled flyback and recovery of a payload fairing.	SES-10
June 3, 2017	First reuse of a commercial cargo spacecraft.	SpaceX CRS-11
February 6, 2018	First private spacecraft launched into heliocentric orbit.	Falcon Heavy test flight
March 2, 2019	First private company to send a human-rated spacecraft to orbit.	Crew Dragon Demo-1
March 3, 2019	First private company to autonomously dock a human-rated spacecraft to the ISS.	Crew Dragon Demo-1
July 25, 2019	First flight of a full-flow staged combustion cycle engine (Raptor).	Starhopper
November 11, 2019	First reuse of a payload fairing.	Starlink 2 v1.0
May 30, 2020	First private company to send humans into orbit.	Crew Dragon Demo-2
May 30, 2020	First private company to send humans to the ISS.	Crew Dragon Demo-2
January 24, 2021	Most spacecraft launched on a single mission, 143 satellites. (Note: Excluding the passive objects launched as part of Project West Ford)	Transporter-1
April 23, 2021	First reuse of a crewed space capsule.	SpaceX Crew-2 / Endeavour
April 23, 2021	First reused booster to send humans into orbit.	SpaceX Crew-2 / Endeavour
June 17, 2021	First reused booster to launch a 'national security' mission.	GPS III-05
September 16, 2021	First orbital launch of an all-private crew.	Inspiration4
November 24, 2021	Longest streak of orbital launches without a mission failure or partial failure for a single rocket type (Falcon 9, 101 launches).	Double Asteroid Redirection Test
April 9, 2022	First all-private crew to dock with the International Space Station.	Axiom Mission 1
October 20, 2022	Highest number of launches of a single rocket type in a calendar year (Falcon 9, 48 launches).	Starlink 4-36
April 20, 2023	Tallest, most massive, most powerful rocket to ever launch.	SpaceX Starship orbital test flight
March 14, 2024	Starship reaches intended orbital velocity for the first time.	SpaceX Starship integrated flight test 3
April 12, 2024	A single Falcon 9 booster reused for the 20th time.	Booster 1062
September 12, 2024	First commercial spacewalk	Polaris Dawn
October 13, 2024	First Super Heavy booster catch	Starship flight test 5
November 19, 2024	First in space relight of a full-flow staged combustion cycle engine (Raptor).	Starship flight test 6
May 27, 2025	First reuse of a Super Heavy booster	Starship flight test 9

== See also ==
- SpaceX Starship design process
