= SpaceX Starship design history =

Development history of the SpaceX Starship vehicle

Before settling on the 2018 Starship design, SpaceX successively presented a number of reusable super-heavy lift vehicle proposals. These preliminary spacecraft designs were known under various names (Mars Colonial Transporter, Interplanetary Transport System, BFR).

In November 2005, before SpaceX had launched its first rocket, the Falcon 1, chief executive officer (CEO) Elon Musk first mentioned a high-capacity rocket concept able to launch 100 t (220,000 lb) to low Earth orbit, dubbed the BFR. In October 2012, Musk first publicly announced plans to develop a rocket surpassing the capabilities of the existing Falcon 9. SpaceX called it the Mars Colonial Transporter, as the rocket was to transport humans to Mars and back. In 2016, the name was changed to Interplanetary Transport System, as the rocket was planned to travel beyond Mars as well. The design called for a carbon fiber structure, a mass in excess of 10,000 t (22,000,000 lb) when fully-fueled, a payload of 300 t (660,000 lb) to low Earth orbit while being fully reusable. By 2017, the concept was temporarily re-dubbed the BFR.

In December 2018, the structural material was changed from carbon composites to stainless steel, marking the transition from early design concepts of the Starship. Musk cited numerous reasons for the design change; low cost, ease of manufacture, increased strength of stainless steel at cryogenic temperatures, and ability to withstand high temperatures. In 2019, SpaceX began to refer to the entire vehicle as Starship, with the second stage also being called Starship and the booster Super Heavy. They also announced that Starship would use reusable heat shield tiles similar to those of the Space Shuttle. The second-stage design had also settled on six Raptor engines by 2019; three optimized for sea-level and three optimized for vacuum. In 2019 SpaceX announced a change to the second stage's design, reducing the number of aft flaps from three to two to reduce weight. In March 2020, SpaceX released a Starship Users Guide, in which they stated the payload of Starship to low Earth orbit (LEO) would be in excess of 100 t (220,000 lb), with a payload to geostationary transfer orbit (GTO) of 21 t (46,000 lb).

== Early heavy-lift concepts ==
In November 2005, before SpaceX launched the Falcon 1, its first rocket, Elon Musk first referenced a long-term and high-capacity rocket concept named BFR. The BFR would be able to launch 100 t (220,000 lb) to LEO and would be equipped with Merlin 2 engines. The Merlin 2 would have been in direct lineage to the Merlin engines used on the Falcon 9, described as a scaled up regeneratively cooled engine comparable to the F-1 engines used on the NASA Saturn V.

In July 2010, after the final launch of Falcon 1 a year prior, SpaceX presented launch vehicle and Mars space tug concepts at a conference. The launch vehicle concepts were called Falcon X, Falcon X Heavy, and Falcon XX, all larger than the Falcon 9, which had first flown in June 2010; the largest of all was the Falcon XX with a 140 t (310,000 lb) capacity to low Earth orbit. To deliver such payload, the rocket would have been as tall as the Saturn V and use six powerful Merlin 2 engines.

== Mars Colonial Transporter ==
In October 2012, the company made the first public articulation of plans to develop a fully reusable rocket system with substantially greater capabilities than SpaceX's existing Falcon 9. Later in 2012, the company first mentioned the Mars Colonial Transporter rocket concept in public. It was going to be able to carry 100 people or 100 t (220,000 lb) of cargo to Mars and would be powered by methane-fueled Raptor engines. Musk referred to this new launch vehicle under the unspecified acronym "MCT", revealed to stand for "Mars Colonial Transporter" in 2013, which would serve the company's Mars system architecture. SpaceX chief operating officer (COO) Gwynne Shotwell gave a potential payload range between 150 and 200 tons to low Earth orbit for the planned rocket. For Mars missions, the spacecraft would carry up to 100 tonnes (220,000 lb) of passengers and cargo. According to SpaceX engine development head Tom Mueller, SpaceX could use nine Raptor engines on a single MCT booster or spacecraft. The preliminary design would be at least 10 meters (33 ft) in diameter, and was expected to have up to three cores totaling at least 27 booster engines.

== Interplanetary Transport System ==
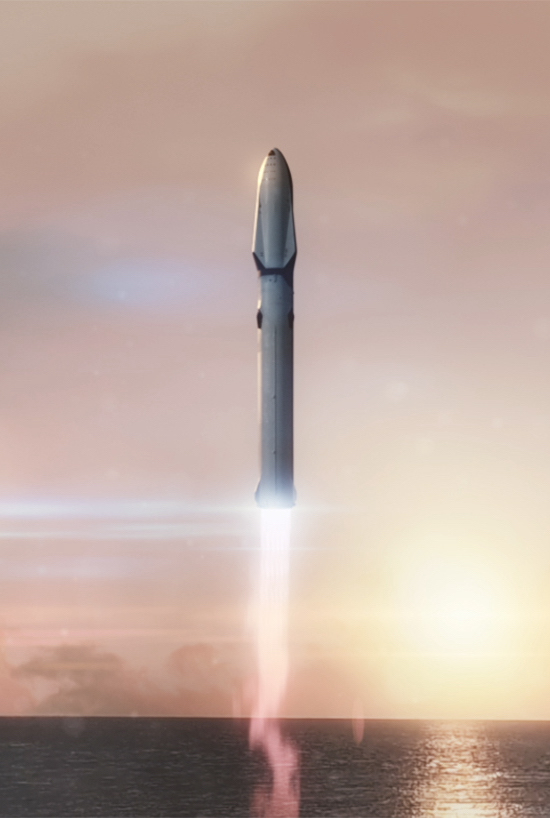
SpaceX illustration of the 2016 Interplanetary Transport System

In 2016, the name of the Mars Colonial Transporter system was changed to the Interplanetary Transport System (ITS), due to the vehicle being capable of other destinations. Additionally, Elon Musk provided more details about the space mission architecture, launch vehicle, spacecraft, and Raptor engines. The first test firing of a Raptor engine on a test stand took place in September 2016.

On September 26, 2016, a day before the 67th International Astronautical Congress, a Raptor engine fired for the first time. At the event, Musk announced SpaceX was developing a new rocket using Raptor engines called the Interplanetary Transport System. It would have two stages, a reusable booster and spacecraft. The stages' tanks were to be made from carbon composite, storing liquid methane and liquid oxygen. Despite the rocket's 300 t (660,000 lb) launch capacity to low Earth orbit, it was expected to have a low launch price. The spacecraft featured three variants: crew, cargo, and tanker; the tanker variant is used to transfer propellant to spacecraft in orbit. The concept, especially the technological feats required to make such a system possible and the funds needed, garnered substantial skepticism. Both stages would use autogenous pressurization of the propellant tanks, eliminating the Falcon 9's problematic high-pressure helium pressurization system.

In October 2016, Musk indicated that the initial tank test article, made of carbon-fiber pre-preg, and built with no sealing liner, had performed well in cryogenic fluid testing. A pressure test at about 2/3 of the design burst pressure was completed in November 2016. In July 2017, Musk indicated that the architecture design had evolved since 2016 in order to support commercial transport via Earth-orbit and cislunar launches.

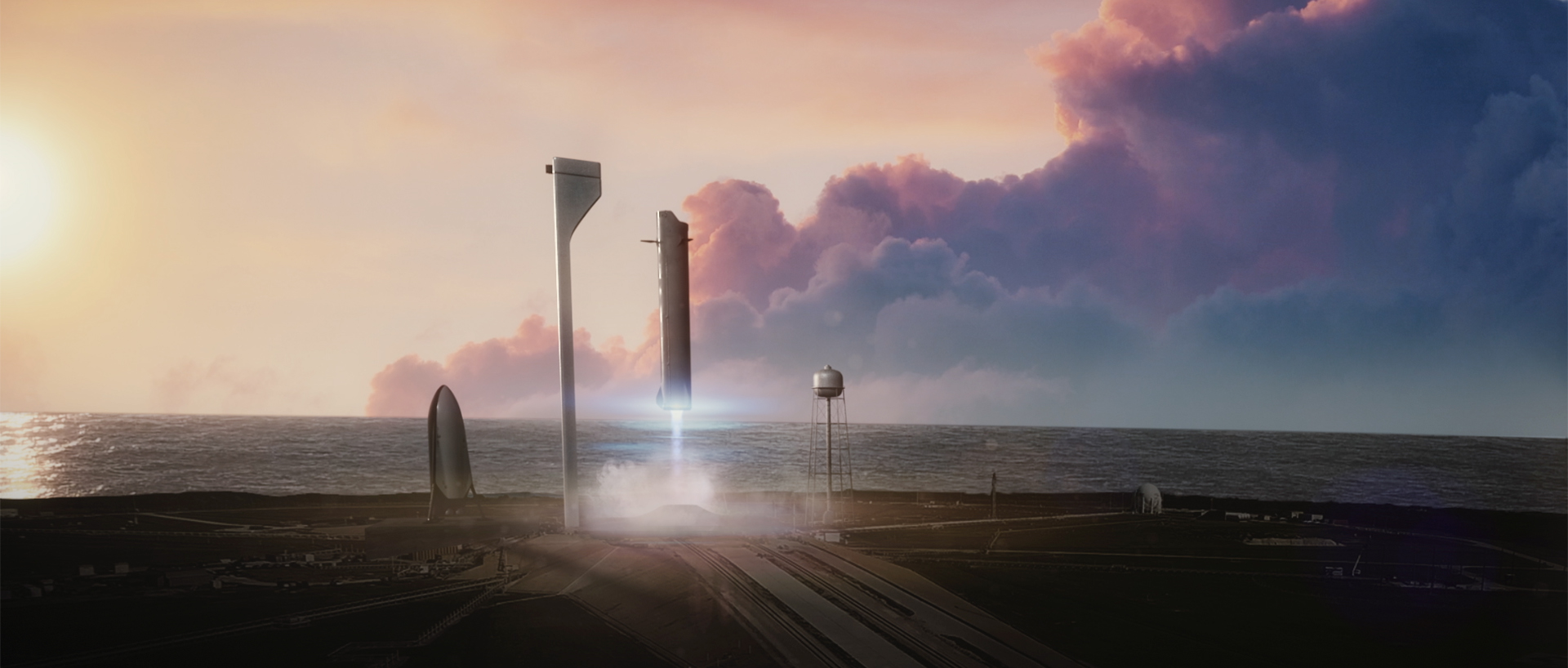
2016 artist's concept of the ITS booster returning to the launch pad

The ITS booster was to be a 12 m-diameter (39 ft), 77.5 m-high (254 ft), reusable first stage powered by 42 engines, each producing 3,024 kilonewtons (680,000 lbf) of thrust. Total booster thrust would have been 128 MN (29,000,000 lbf) at liftoff, increasing to 138 MN (31,000,000 lbf) in a vacuum, several times the 36 MN (8,000,000 lbf) thrust of the Saturn V. It weighed 275 tonnes (606,000 lb) when empty and 6,700 tonnes (14,800,000 lb) when completely filled with propellant. It would have used grid fins to help guide the booster through the atmosphere for a precise landing. The engine configuration included 21 engines in an outer ring and 14 in an inner ring. The center cluster of seven engines would be able to gimbal for directional control, although some directional control would be achieved via differential thrust with the fixed engines. Each engine would be capable of throttling between 20 and 100 percent of rated thrust.

The design goal was to achieve a separation velocity of about 8,650 km/h (5,370 mph) while retaining about 7% of the initial propellant to achieve a vertical landing at the launch pad.The design called for grid fins to guide the booster during atmospheric reentry. The booster return flights were expected to encounter loads lower than the Falcon 9, principally because the ITS would have both a lower mass ratio and a lower density. The booster was to be designed for 20 g nominal loads, and possibly as high as 30–40 g.

In contrast to the landing approach used on SpaceX's Falcon 9—either a large, flat concrete pad or downrange floating landing platform, the ITS booster was to be designed to land on the launch mount itself, for immediate refueling and relaunch.

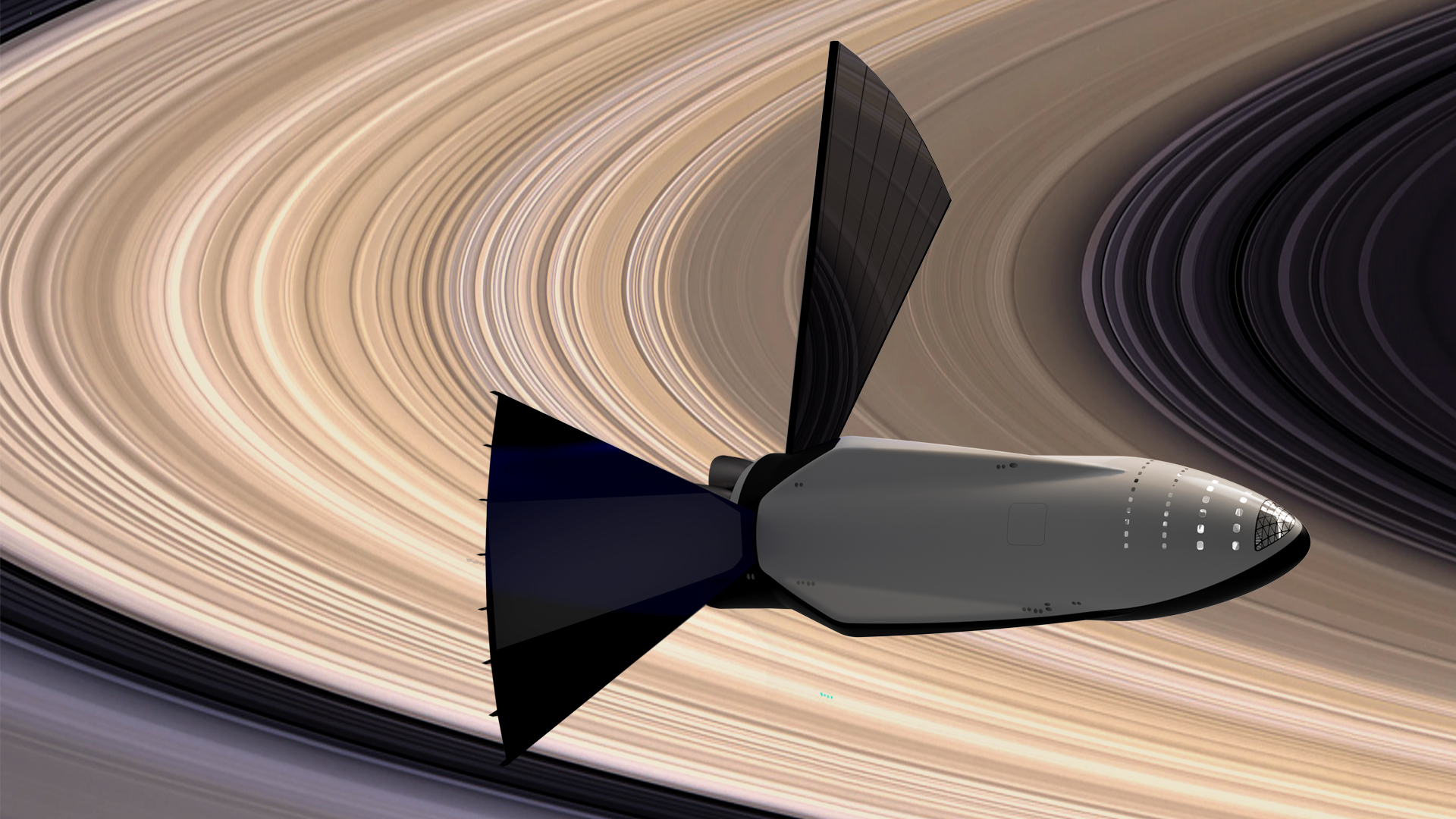
2016 artist concept of the ITS Interplanetary Spaceship, in orbit near the rings of Saturn

The ITS second stage was planned to be used for long-duration spaceflight, instead of solely being used for reaching orbit. The two proposed variants aimed to be reusable. Its maximum width would be 17 m (56 ft), with three sea level Raptor engines, and six optimized for vacuum firing. Total engine thrust in a vacuum was to be about 31 MN (7,000,000 lbf).

- The Interplanetary Spaceship would have operated as a second-stage and interplanetary transport vehicle for cargo and passengers. It aimed to transport up to 450 tonnes (990,000 lb) per trip to Mars following refueling in Earth orbit. Its three sea-level Raptor engines were designed to be used for maneuvering, descent, landing, and initial ascent from the Mars surface. It would have had a maximum capacity of 1,950 tonnes (4,300,000 lb) of propellant, and a dry mass of 150 tonnes (330,000 lb).
- The ITS tanker would serve as a propellant tanker, transporting up to 380 tonnes (840,000 lb) of propellants to low Earth orbit in a single launch. After refueling operations, it would land and be prepared for another flight. It had a maximum capacity of 2,500 tonnes (5,500,000 lb) of propellant and had a dry mass of 90 tonnes (200,000 lb).

== Big Falcon Rocket ==
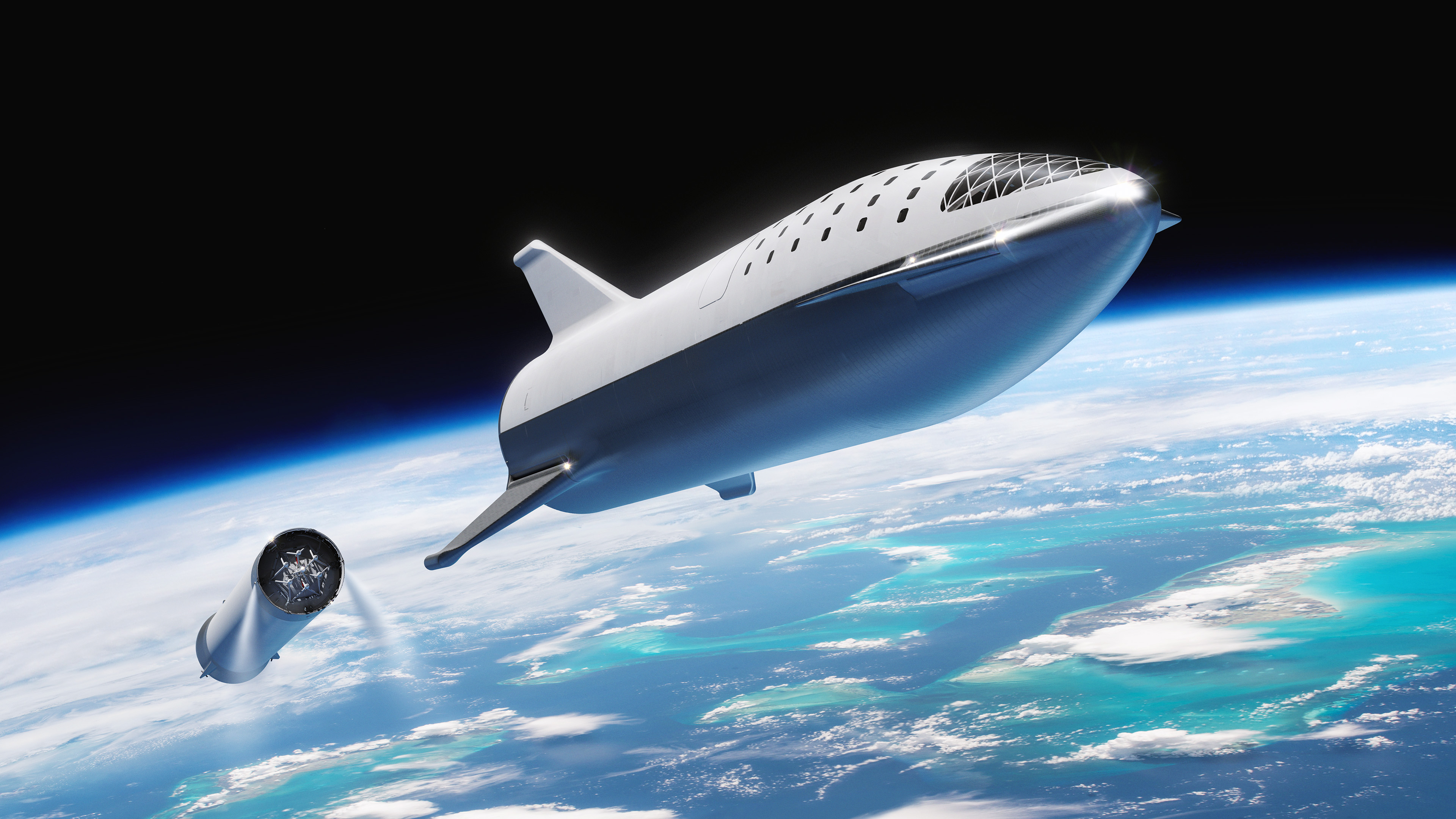
2018 artist's conception of the redesigned BFR/Starship at stage separation

In September 2017, at the 68th annual meeting of the International Astronautical Congress, Musk announced a new launch vehicle calling it the BFR, again changing the name, though stating that the name was temporary. The acronym was alternatively stated as standing for Big Falcon Rocket or Big Fucking Rocket, a tongue-in-cheek reference to the BFG ("Big Fucking Gun") from the Doom video game series. Musk foresaw the first two cargo missions to Mars as early as 2022, a target that was not met, with the goal to "confirm water resources and identify hazards" while deploying "power, mining, and life support infrastructure" for future flights. This would be followed by four ships in 2024, two crewed BFR spaceships plus two cargo-only ships carrying equipment and supplies for a propellant plant.

The design balanced objectives such as payload mass, landing capabilities, and reliability. The initial design showed the ship with six Raptor engines (two sea-level, four vacuum) down from nine in the previous ITS design.

By September 2017, Raptors had been test-fired for a combined total of 20 minutes across 42 test cycles. The longest test was 100 seconds, limited by the size of the propellant tanks. The test engine operated at 20 MPa (200 bar; 2,900 psi). The flight engine aimed for 25 MPa (250 bar; 3,600 psi), on the way to 30 MPa (300 bar; 4,400 psi) in later iterations. In November 2017, Shotwell indicated that about half of all development work on BFR was focused on the engine.

SpaceX looked for manufacturing sites in California, Texas, Louisiana, and Florida. By September 2017, SpaceX had started building launch vehicle components: "The tooling for the main tanks has been ordered, the facility is being built, we will start construction of the first ship [in the second quarter of 2018.]"

By early 2018, the first carbon composite prototype ship was under construction, and SpaceX had begun building a new production facility at the Port of Los Angeles, California.

In March, SpaceX announced that it would manufacture its launch vehicle and spaceship at a new facility on Seaside Drive at the port. By May, about 40 SpaceX employees were working on the BFR. SpaceX planned to transport the launch vehicle by barge, through the Panama Canal, to Cape Canaveral for launch. In 2019, SpaceX withdrew from the Port of Los Angeles plan and moved Starship construction to Texas and Florida.

In August 2018, the head of the US Air Force Air Mobility Command expressed interest in the ability of the BFR to move up to 150 t (330,000 lb) of cargo anywhere in the world in under 30 minutes, for "less than the cost of a C-5".

The BFR was designed to be 106 meters (348 ft) tall, 9 meters (30 ft) in diameter, and made of carbon composites. The upper stage, known as Big Falcon Ship (BFS), included a small delta wing at the rear end with split flaps for pitch and roll control. The delta wing and split flaps were said to expand the flight envelope to allow the ship to land in a variety of atmospheric densities (vacuum, thin, or heavy atmosphere) with a wide range of payloads. The BFS design originally had six Raptor engines, with four vacuum and two sea-level. By late 2017, SpaceX added a seventh, "medium area ratio" engine to allow greater Earth-to-Earth payload landings and still ensure capability if one of the engines fails. (Note: "Still ensuring capability if one of the engine fails" is what the source means by "engine-out capability".)

Three BFS versions were described: BFS cargo, BFS tanker, and BFS crew. The cargo version would have been used to reach Earth orbit as well as carry cargo to the Moon or Mars. After refueling in an elliptical Earth orbit, BFS was designed to eventually be able to land on the Moon and return to Earth without another refueling. The BFR also aimed to carry passengers/cargo in Earth-to-Earth transport, delivering its payload anywhere within 90 minutes.

== Changes to early Starship design ==
In December 2018, the structural material was changed from carbon composites to stainless steel, marking the transition from early design concepts of the Starship. Musk cited numerous reasons for the design change; low cost and ease of manufacture, increased strength of stainless steel at cryogenic temperatures, as well as its ability to withstand high heat. The high temperature at which 300-series steel transitions to plastic deformation would eliminate the need for a heat shield on Starship's leeward side, while the much hotter windward side would be cooled by allowing fuel or water to bleed through micropores in a double-wall stainless steel skin, removing heat by evaporation. The liquid-cooled windward side was changed in 2019 to use reusable heat shield tiles similar to those of the Space Shuttle.

In 2019, SpaceX began to refer to the entire vehicle as Starship, with the second stage being called Starship and the booster Super Heavy. In September 2019, Musk held an event about Starship development during which he further detailed the lower-stage booster, the upper-stage's method of controlling its descent, the heat shield, orbital refueling capacity, and potential destinations besides Mars.

Over the years of design, the proportion of sea-level engines to vacuum engines on the second stage varied drastically. By 2019, the second stage design had settled on six Raptor engines—three optimized for sea-level and three optimized for vacuum. To decrease weight, aft flaps on the second stage were reduced from three to two. Later in 2019, Musk stated that Starship was expected to have a mass of 120,000 kg (260,000 lb) and be able to initially transport a payload of 100,000 kg (220,000 lb), growing to 150,000 kg (330,000 lb) over time. In August 2021, Musk hinted at an expendable variant that could place 250 tonnes into low orbit.

== Starship and moon landing ==
As development of the rocket progressed, it coincided with NASA's renewed lunar exploration efforts under the Artemis program. The resulting partnership led the company to revise its near-term objectives, prioritizing a crewed lunar landing before pursuing missions to Mars. In 2021, NASA selected a lunar variant of the spacecraft as the Human Landing System (HLS) for the program. NASA and the company have continued to address scheduling and technical challenges associated with the Starship's translunar program in an effort to accelerate the deployment schedule for future lunar missions.

== "Earth to Earth" flights ==
One possible future use of Starship that SpaceX has proposed is point-to-point flights (called "Earth to Earth" flights by SpaceX), traveling anywhere on Earth in under an hour. In 2017 SpaceX president and chief operating officer Gwynne Shotwell stated that point-to-point travel with passengers could become cost competitive with conventional business class flights. John Logsdon, an academic on space policy and history, said that the idea of transporting passengers in this manner was "extremely unrealistic", as the craft would switch between weightlessness to 5 g of acceleration. He also commented that “Musk calls all of this ‘aspirational,’ which is a nice code word for more than likely not achievable.”

== See also ==
- History of SpaceX
- Space Shuttle design process
- SpaceX ambition of colonizing Mars
- Studied Space Shuttle designs
