= List of Starfall launches =

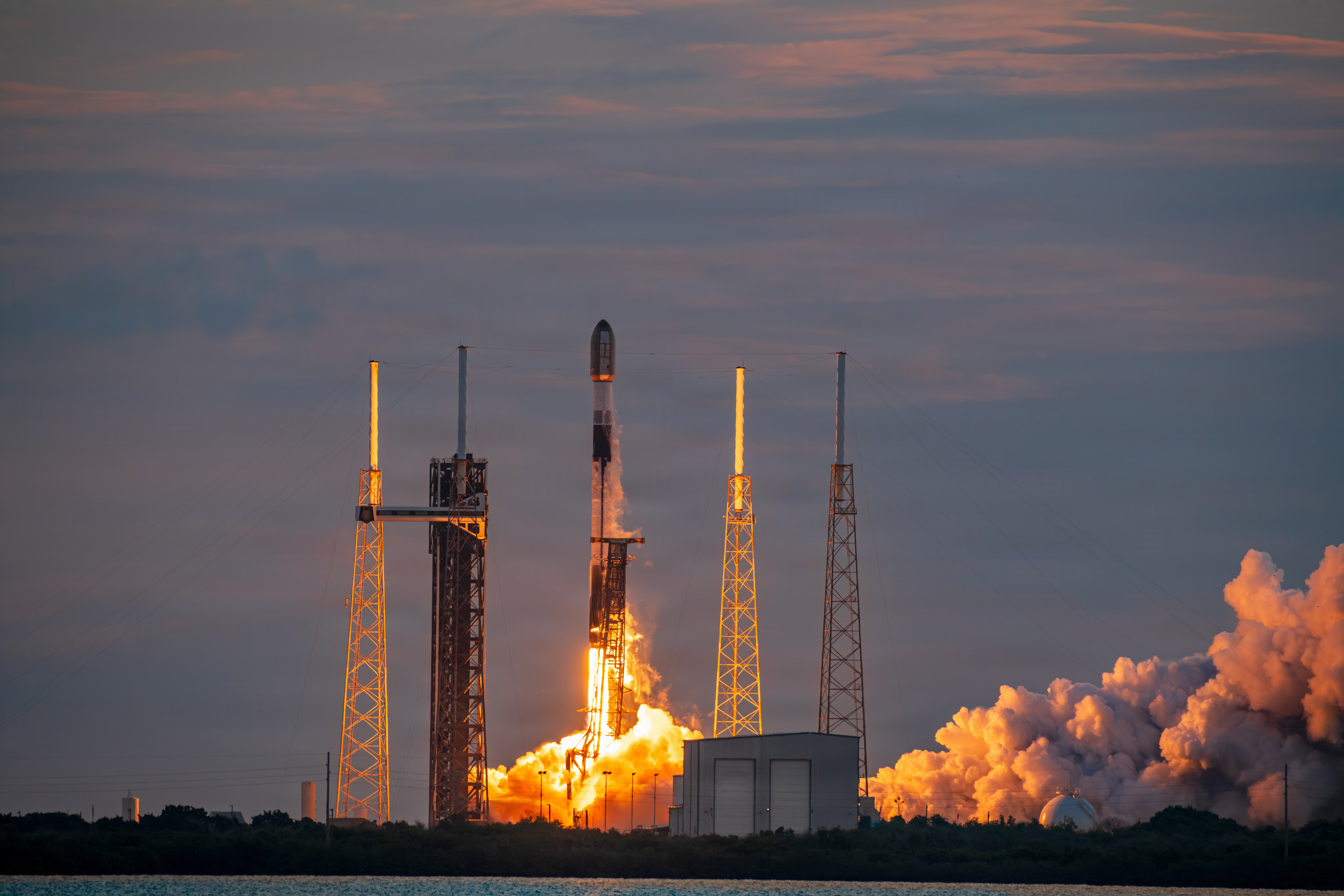
The first Starfall Demo launch from Cape Canaveral Space Launch Complex 40 in June 2026.

Starfall is a class of space capsules designed to return payloads to Earth from orbit/near orbit. It was developed by SpaceX. The vehicle is intended to provide uncrewed, point-to-point cargo delivery of Earth and space-manufactured products by providing safe atmospheric reentry and recovery.

== Launch statistics ==
=== Mission statistics ===
- Failure
- Partial failure
- Success
- Planned

=== Vehicle statistics ===
- Falcon 9
- Falcon Heavy

== Past launches ==
Flight No.	Date and time (UTC)	Version, booster	Launch site	Payload	Orbit	Outcome
1	23 June 2026, 10:43	Falcon 9 Block 5 B1078‑29	Cape Canaveral, SLC‑40	SpaceX Starfall	LEO	Success
1	23 June 2026, 10:43	Starfall Demo				
2	20 October 2026, 11:04	Falcon 9 Block 5 B1085‑19	Cape Canaveral, SLC‑40	SpaceX Starfall	LEO	Success
2	20 October 2026, 11:04	Launched as a part of Bandwagon-5 mission.				
