= SpaceX Starfall =

Space capsule type for cargo delivery from space

Starfall
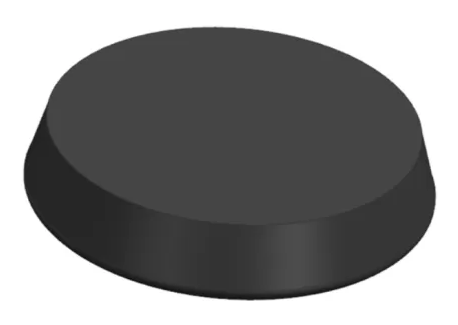
- Manufacturer: SpaceX
- Country of origin: US
- Operator: SpaceX
- Applications: Cargo delivery from space

Specifications
- Spacecraft type: Space capsule

Production
- Launched: 2
- Maiden launch: 23 June 2026

Related spacecraft
- Launch vehicle: Falcon 9, Starship (planned)

Starfall is a space capsule designed to return payloads to Earth from orbit/near orbit, developed by SpaceX. The vehicle intends to provide uncrewed, point-to-point cargo delivery of earth and space-manufactured products by providing atmospheric reentry and recovery. Starfall builds on SpaceX experience with Dragon capsules and Starship reentry technologies.

== Design ==
SpaceX Starfall has a circular, disk-shaped form measuring 3.1 m (10 ft) in diameter and .75 m (2 ft 6 in) in height. Its empty mass is 2,100 kg (4,600 lb). Starfall carries up to 1,000 kilograms of payload in a volume of 2.5 m (8 ft 2 in) by 1.5 by 0.5 meters and a total mass of about 3,100 kilograms. The vehicle consists of a top plate with maneuvering thrusters and a heat shield that jettisons before a parachute assisted splashdown. It can be carried to orbit by either Starship or Falcon 9.

Technical specifications
Diameter	3.1 m
Height	0.75 m
Empty mass	2,100 kg
Payload mass	up to 1,000 kg
Payload volume	2.5 × 1.5 × 0.5 m
Total mass	~3,100 kg
Launch vehicles	Falcon 9 or Starship

== Operations ==
Starfall can loiter in space indefinitely. Reentry follows a pre-planned path. Initial tests splash down typically 1,300 km (810 mi) kilometers west of the US or Mexico. Recovery teams retrieve the capsule, heat shield, and parachutes. Operations could expand to support point-to-point delivery for Earth-produced goods. Starship can carry multiple Starfall units to orbit in one launch.

== Applications ==
Starfall targets two main applications:

- Point-to-point delivery of critical cargo on short timelines
- Delivery from orbit for microgravity manufacturing

In-space production may benefit pharmaceutical and advanced material production such as single crystal optical fiber, and even bio-printed human organs, because some materials cannot be produced in the presence of gravity. Military applications include fast global resupply. Starfall offers smaller capacity than Starship cargo variants, but also requires no landing infrastructure. SpaceX Rocket Cargo contracts with the U.S. Air Force target larger point-to-point deliveries. Targets reach up to 100 tons.

== Relation to Starship ==
Starship is intended to provide heavy-lift capability to orbit. Starfall is designed to handle precise return of smaller payloads. Starship features a large payload bay for deployment of satellites and cargo. Its heat shield is being designed for eventual rapid reuse, including catch by launch tower arms. Starship payload capacity may exceed 100 metric tons to low Earth orbit in reusable configuration. Starfall complements Starship capabilities by addressing return logistics for orbital assets.

== History ==
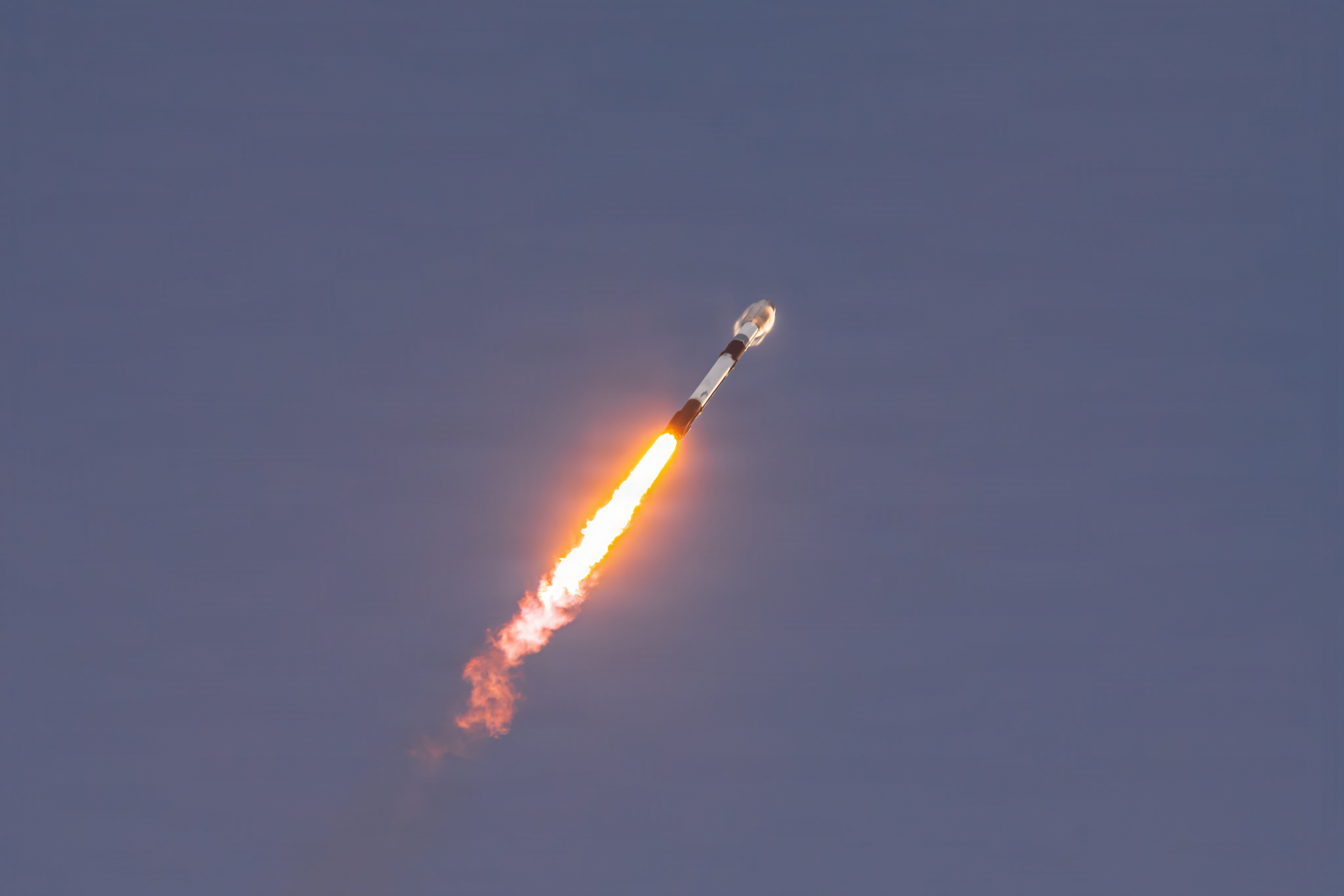
June 2026's maiden launch of Starfall Demo.

SpaceX revealed Starfall plans through FAA filings in 2026. The agency issued final environmental approval on 15 May 2026, for two test missions. These tests were designed to assess reentry, splashdown, and recovery operations to clear the way for safety licensing reviews. SpaceX launched the first Starfall demonstration mission on a Falcon 9 rocket on 23 June 2026.

== See also ==
- SpaceX Starship
- Rocket Cargo
- SpaceX Dragon
- Varda Space Industries
