= Rocket Cargo =

US military advanced spaceflight program

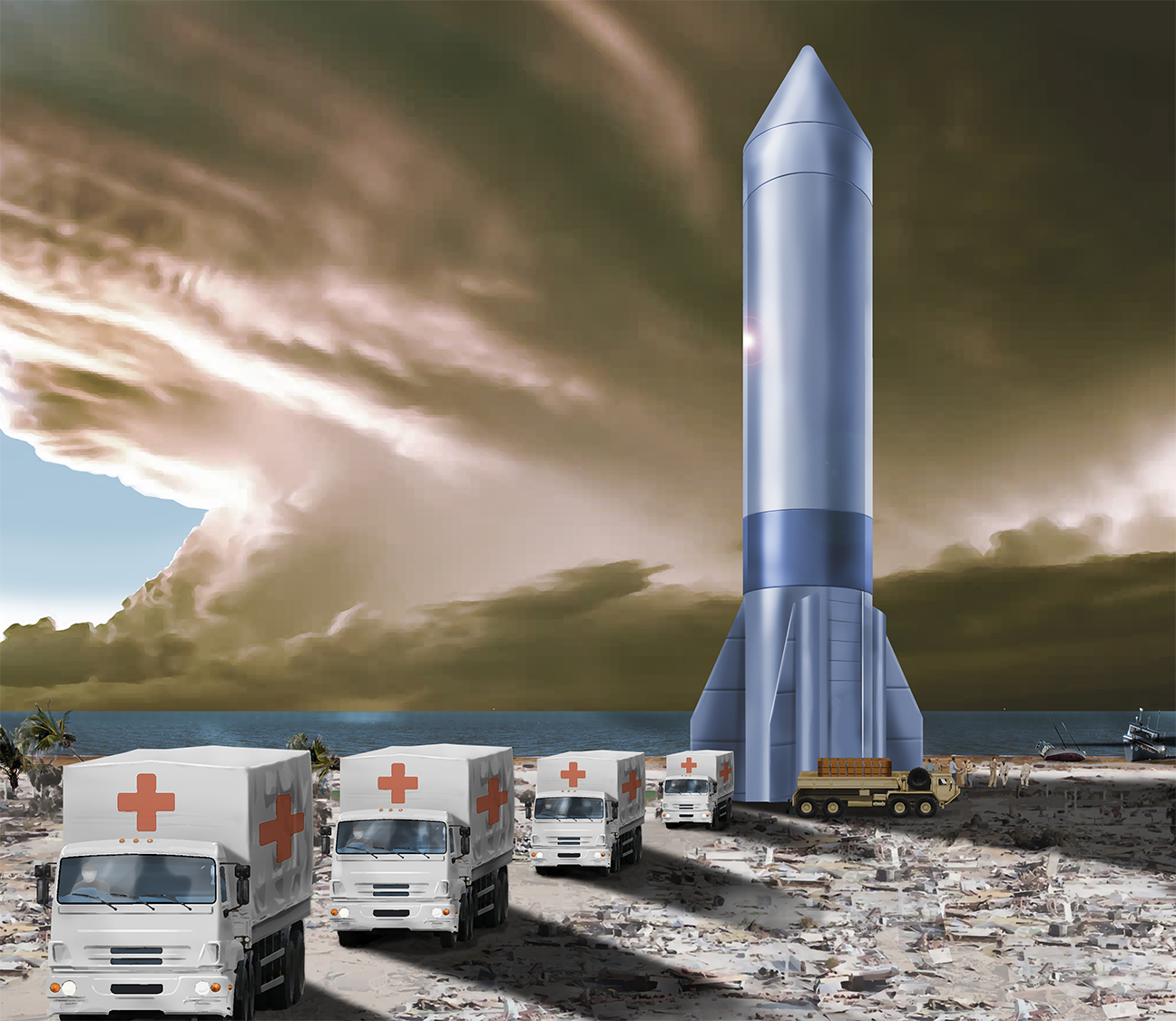
Rocket Cargo illustration

Rocket Cargo is a United States Space Force program run through the Air Force Research Laboratory (AFRL) for suborbital spaceflight rocket-delivered cargo involving point-to-point space travel. The program is to develop the capability to rapidly send cargo anywhere in the world on a rocket. It would involve reusable rockets that can perform propulsive landings on a variety of landing sites, to deliver a C-17's worth of cargo in an hour. The program was discussed in 2020 and announced in 2021, with a budget allocation request for Fiscal Year 2022.

== History ==
In the 1960s, the military studied using Douglas Ithacus T-100 rockets to rocket off aircraft carriers to deliver marines to theatres.

In 2018, the Air Force started studying delivering cargo via rockets. In 2020, U.S. Transportation Command consulted with SpaceX on the delivery of 100 tons of cargo via rocket anywhere in the world in under 1 hour with Starship. In 2021, the Pentagon announced the Rocket Cargo program, with the U.S. Space Force as the lead service on the program. $9.7 million U.S. dollars were allocated to Rocket Cargo in FY21. The Pentagon Budget Office has requested $48 million US for FY 2022 for the program. In 2022, the Department of the Air Force awarded a $102 million, 5-year contract to SpaceX to demonstrate technologies and capabilities to transport military cargo and humanitarian aid around the world.

As of 2024, the Air Force and SpaceX aim to perform a demonstration mission as early as 2026 using SpaceX's Starship launch vehicle. The Department of Defense has planned a test with Starship as part of their program to demonstrate the ability to rapidly deploy up to 100 tons of cargo and supplies, a capability it calls point to point delivery (P2PD). The test is envisioned to take place in FY25 or FY26.

On 28 February 2025, the Department of the Air Force filed a Notice of Intent in the Federal Register for draft Environmental Assessment of Rocket Cargo testing at Johnston Atoll. This plan involved up to 10 reentry vehicle landings annually over 4 consecutive years, at two landing pads, but was suspended in July 2025.

In May 2025, Rocket Lab was awarded a contract from AFRL to fly a Rocket Cargo "survivability experiment" under the Rocket Experimentation for Global Agile Logistics (REGAL) program. This experiment is scheduled to launch on a Rocket Lab Neutron rocket no earlier than 2026 and "re-enter Earth’s atmosphere, in a demonstration of re-entry capability for future REGAL missions."

In August 2025, additional REGAL study contracts were awarded to Anduril and Blue Origin to study orbital cargo transport.

== Objectives ==
The program is an Air Force Research Laboratory "Vanguard" program, a top importance science and technology research and development program. At the time of announcement, it was one of four such programs for the United States Department of the Air Force. The program is to examine modifying existing commercially available hardware for the program objectives. It would involve moving approximately a C-17 Globemaster III's worth of cargo or approximately 100 short tons (91 tonnes), anywhere in the world in under 1 hour. It would use a propulsively-landing reusable rocket that would transport cargo from source to destination, landing in all kinds of environments.

== See also ==
- Prompt Global Strike
- Rocket mail—delivery of mail by rocket
- SpaceX Starfall
- SpaceX Starshield, other involvement of the military with SpaceX
- Starlink in the Russo-Ukrainian War
