= Methane (data page) =

Chemical data page

This page provides supplementary chemical data on methane.

== Material Safety Data Sheet ==
The handling of this chemical may incur notable safety precautions.

== Structure and properties ==
Structure and properties
Index of refraction, n_{D}	1.000444
Dielectric constant, ε_{r}	1.6761 ε_{0} at −182 °C; 1.0008181 ε_{0} at −20 °C
Bond strength	?
Bond length	0.10870 nm
Bond angle	109.5°
Magnetic susceptibility	−17.4×10^{−6} cm^{3}/mol

== Thermodynamic properties ==
Phase behavior
Triple point	90.67 K (−182.48 °C), 0.117 bar
Critical point	190.6 K (−82.6 °C), 46.0 bar
Std enthalpy change of fusion, Δ_{fus}H^{~~o~~}	1.1 kJ/mol
Std entropy change of fusion, Δ_{fus}S^{~~o~~}	12.1 J/(mol·K)
Std enthalpy change of vaporization, Δ_{vap}H^{~~o~~}	8.17 kJ/mol
Std entropy change of vaporization, Δ_{vap}S^{~~o~~}	? J/(mol·K)
Solid properties
Std enthalpy change of formation, Δ_{f}H^{~~o~~}_{solid}	? kJ/mol
Standard molar entropy, S^{~~o~~}_{solid}	? J/(mol K)
Heat capacity, c_{p}	? J/(mol K)
Liquid properties
Std enthalpy change of formation, Δ_{f}H^{~~o~~}_{liquid}	? kJ/mol
Standard molar entropy, S^{~~o~~}_{liquid}	? J/(mol K)
Heat capacity, c_{p}	? J/(mol K)
Gas properties
Std enthalpy change of formation, Δ_{f}H^{~~o~~}_{gas}	−74.6 kJ/mol
Standard molar entropy, S^{~~o~~}_{gas}	186.3 J/(mol K)
Enthalpy of combustion Δ_{c}H^{~~o~~}	−802 kJ/mol
Heat capacity, c_{p}	35.7 J/(mol K)
van der Waals' constants	a = 228.29 L^{2} kPa/mol^{2} b = 0.04278 L/mol

== Vapor pressure of liquid ==
P (mm Hg)	1	10	40	100	400	760	1520	3800	7600	15200	30400	45600
T (°C)	−205.9_{(s)}	−195.5_{(s)}	−187.7_{(s)}	−181.4	−168.8	−161.5	−152.3	−138.3	−124.8	−108.5	−86.3	—

Table data obtained from CRC Handbook of Chemistry and Physics 44th ed. Annotation "(s)" indicates equilibrium temperature of vapor over solid. Otherwise temperature is equilibrium of vapor over liquid. Note that these are all negative temperature values.

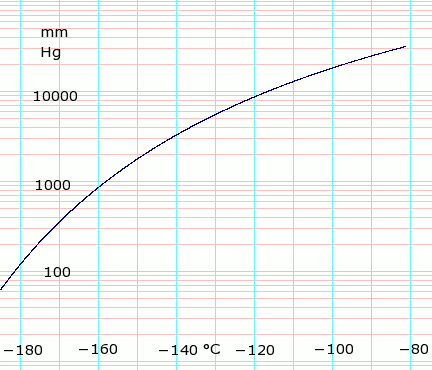
Methane vapor pressure vs. temperature. Uses formula $\log_{10} P_\text{mm Hg} = 6.61184 - \frac{389.93}{266.00 + T_{^\circ\text{C}}}$ given in Lange's Handbook of Chemistry, 10th ed. Note that formula loses accuracy near T_{crit} = −82.6 °C

== Spectral data ==
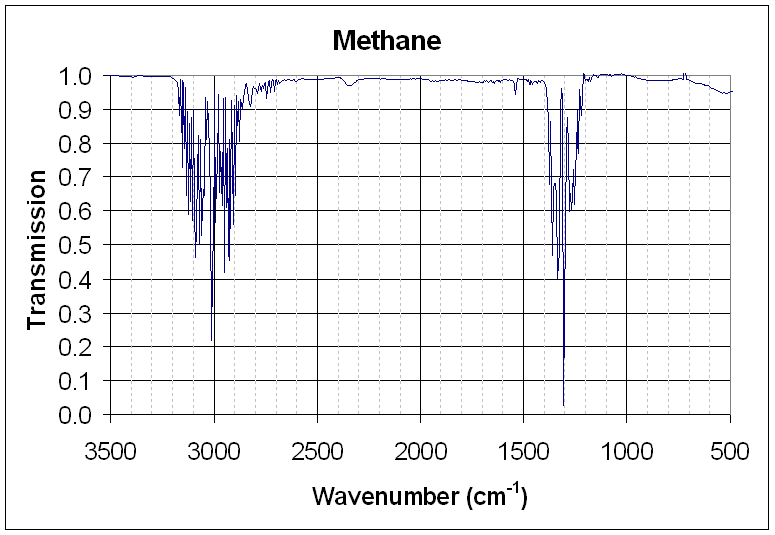
Methane infrared spectrum

UV-Vis
λ_{max}	? nm
Extinction coefficient, ε	?
IR
Major absorption bands	3019, 2917, 1534, 1306 cm^{−1}
NMR
Proton NMR
Carbon-13 NMR	−2.3 ppm
Other NMR data
MS
Masses of main fragments

This box:
- Except where noted otherwise, data relate to Standard temperature and pressure.
- Reliability of data general note.

== Cited sources ==
- Haynes, William M., ed. (2016). CRC Handbook of Chemistry and Physics (97th ed.). CRC Press. ISBN 9781498754293.
