= Gwynne Shotwell =

American business executive (born 1963)

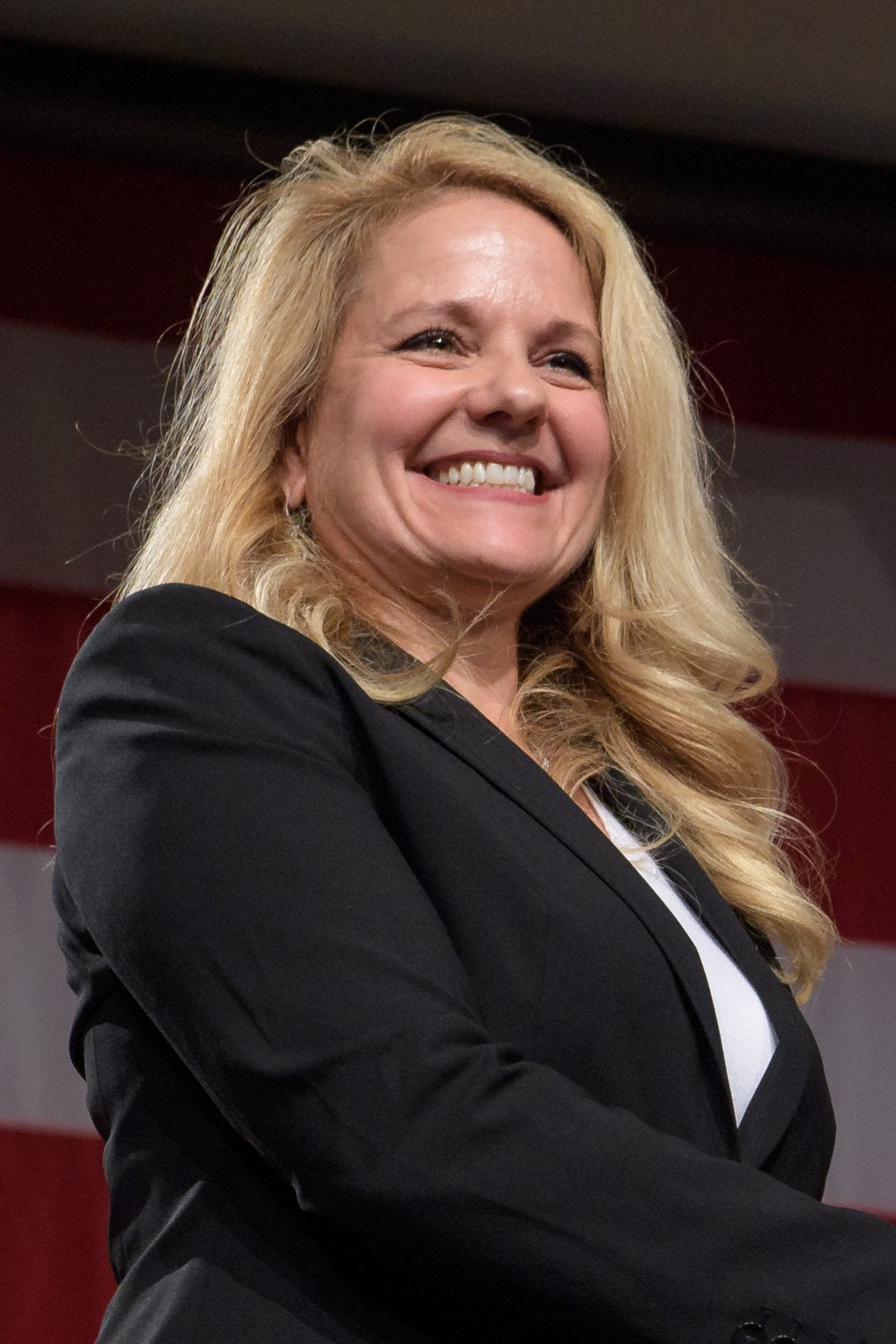
- Shotwell in 2018
- Born: Gwynne Rowley; November 23, 1963 (age 62); Evanston, Illinois, U.S.
- Education: Northwestern University (BS, MS)
- Title: President and chief operating officer of SpaceX
- Spouse(s): Leon Gurevich (div.); Robert Shotwell
- Children: 2

Gwynne Shotwell (née Rowley, previously Gurevich; born November 23, 1963) is an American business executive and engineer. She is the president and chief operating officer of SpaceX, a publicly traded American space transportation company, where she is responsible for day-to-day operations and company growth, and a member of its board of directors.

== Early life ==
Shotwell was born in Evanston, Illinois, as the middle of three daughters. Her father was a brain surgeon and her mother was an artist. She was raised in Libertyville, Illinois. In 1982, she graduated from Libertyville High School. Shotwell excelled in both academics and athletics in high school, where she was on the cheerleading and varsity basketball teams while achieving at the top of her class.

Shotwell's interests changed during high school after her mother took her to a panel discussion at the Illinois Institute of Technology by the Society of Women Engineers, where a mechanical engineer in particular inspired Shotwell to become an engineer. Following this, she decided to apply to Northwestern University, where she received a Bachelor of Science in mechanical engineering, and later a Master of Science degree in applied mathematics.

== Career ==
At the beginning of her career, Shotwell took a job in the automotive industry at Chrysler Corporation's management training program, which she initially enjoyed but later grew tired of and left to return to Northwestern for her graduate degree.

In 1988, Shotwell began work at the El Segundo research center of The Aerospace Corporation, and did technical work on military space research and development contracts. An early project she worked on was Space Transportation Systems 39 (STS-39), a crewed spaceflight. During a ten-year tenure, she worked in thermal analysis. Shotwell worked in both space systems engineering and project management positions.

She left The Aerospace Corporation in 1998 to become director of the space systems division at Microcosm Inc., a small rocket company in El Segundo. There, she was on the executive committee and was responsible for business development.

=== SpaceX ===
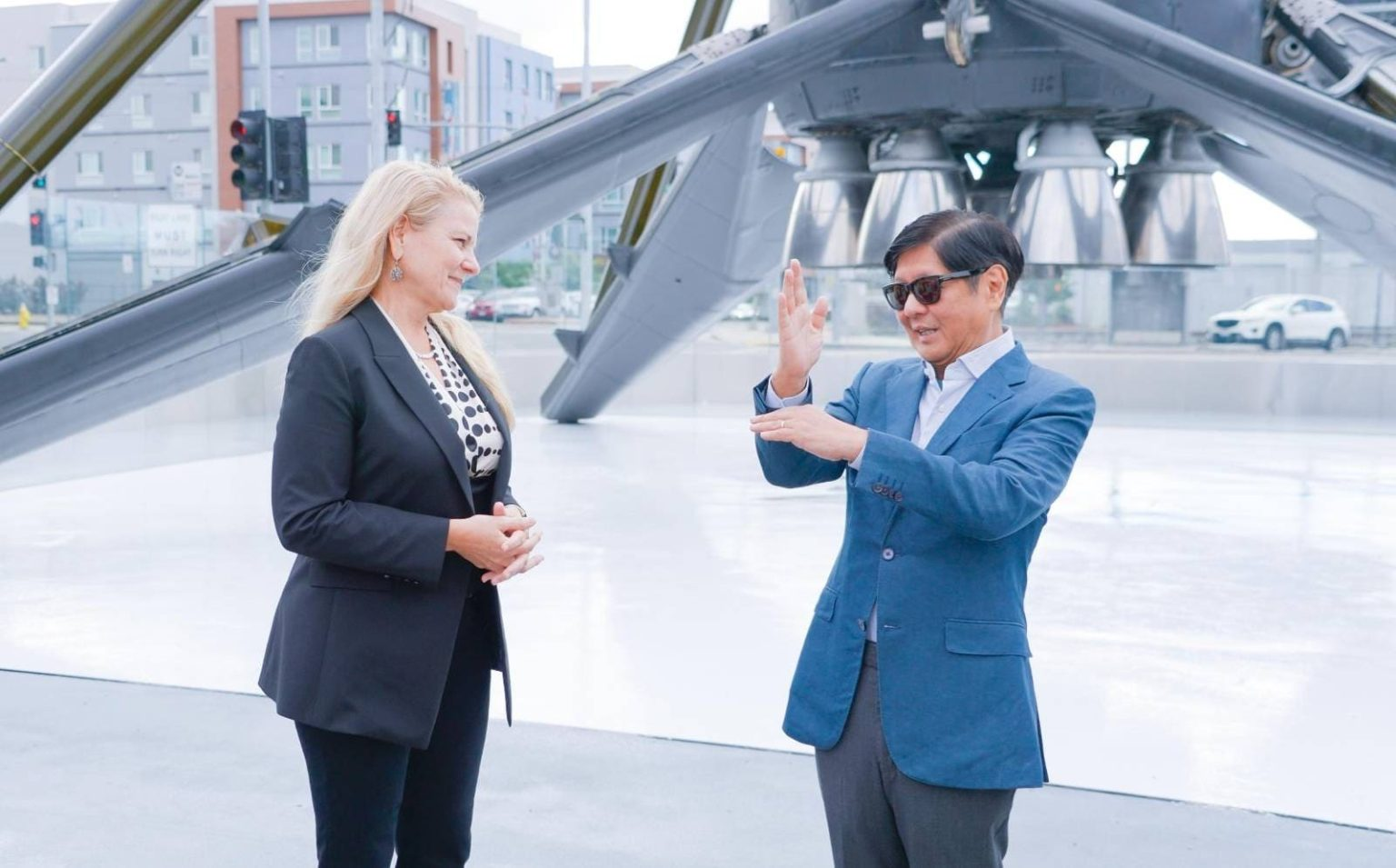
Shotwell with Philippine President Bongbong Marcos in 2023

Shotwell left Microcosm in 2002 to join SpaceX, a then-private space exploration company founded by Elon Musk in the same year. She was introduced to Musk through her former Microcosm colleague Hans Königsmann who had joined SpaceX. In that meeting, she convinced Musk that SpaceX should hire a dedicated employee to work on business development full-time, but had not planned to join the company herself. Shotwell took the job two weeks later in September 2002. In December 2008, Shotwell was promoted to company president following her role in the successful negotiation of the first Commercial Resupply Services contract with the NASA Associate Administrator Bill Gerstenmaier. This followed SpaceX's first successful launch of the Falcon 1 on its fourth attempt earlier in the year. She was responsible for leading the effort on building the Falcon Vehicle manifest to over 50 launches, generating US$5 billion in revenue. This included a commercial connection to the International Space Station for resupplying services, where they were able to deliver cargo and supplies to the astronauts. Shotwell is the President and COO of SpaceX, responsible for day-to-day operations and managing all customer and strategic relations to support company growth.

She oversaw the first landing of an orbital rocket's first stage on land and on an ocean platform, the first relaunch and landing of a used orbital rocket, the first controlled flyback and recovery of a payload fairing, and the first re-flight of a commercial cargo spacecraft. SpaceX has a multibillion-dollar contract with NASA to deliver astronauts and science instruments to the International Space Station. On May 30, 2020, SpaceX became the first private company to launch two astronauts to Earth orbit. On June 12, 2026, Shotwell represented SpaceX at Nasdaq in New York for the company's initial public offering, which raised about $75 billion, the largest IPO in history. She has served on SpaceX's board of directors since March 2009. Her total compensation for 2025 was about $85.8 million, mostly from stock options, on a base salary of $1.08 million. Fortune reported that after the first day of trading, her stake was worth more than $2 billion.

Shotwell has received particular praise from then-NASA Administrator Bill Nelson for her "phenomenal" leadership of SpaceX as it developed the Falcon 9 into the "workhorse" of the space launch sector. Nelson had reportedly been concerned in 2022, after Elon Musk purchased Twitter, that it would distract Musk from focusing on SpaceX, but became more comfortable after meetings with Shotwell left him feeling reassured that she was in charge of day-to-day operations.

In March 2019, Shotwell joined the board of directors of Polaris Industries. As of 2026, she remained a Polaris director and also served on Northwestern University's Board of Trustees.

Shotwell has been on the California Space Authority board of directors and its executive committee after she was elected in 2004. She has been an officer on the AIAA Space Systems Technical Committee and participates in a variety of STEM related programs. She led a committee that raised over $350,000 in scholarships for the Frank J. Redd Student Competition over six years.

In January 2024, the National Labor Relations Board issued a complaint alleging that SpaceX had illegally fired eight employees in 2022 over an open letter criticizing Musk, and that Shotwell had unlawfully restricted employees from circulating it. SpaceX responded by suing to challenge the constitutionality of the NLRB.

==== Starlink use in Ukraine ====
Following the 2022 invasion of Ukraine, Shotwell led negotiations with Ukrainian government agencies for Starlink satellite services, which were at first donated by SpaceX. These arrangements were later formalized in a US Department of Defense contract to buy Starlink for Ukraine. Earlier, Shotwell had announced that her company took measures to prevent the use of Starlink to control combat drones. She stated Ukrainians had used the service in ways that were not part of the agreement; she had agreed to donate Starlink satellite services for communications, defense and humanitarian purposes such as "ambulances, hospitals and mothers", but had not intended it to be weaponized for drone strikes.

== Public outreach ==
On March 2, 2026, Shotwell gave a keynote at Mobile World Congress in Barcelona, where SpaceX announced the name "Starlink Mobile" for its direct-to-cell service.

Shotwell gave a TED talk at TEDxChapmanU in June 2013 on the importance of science, technology, engineering, and mathematics (STEM). She speaks regularly to business audiences and gave a talk for the "Captains of Industry" series at the Brent Scowcroft Center on International Security in June 2014 on private entrepreneurial accomplishments in advancing spaceflight technology.

At the 2018 TED conference, Shotwell was interviewed by Chris Anderson about the future plans of SpaceX.

At the Grace Hopper Celebration of Women in Computing on September 28, 2018, Shotwell's talk was titled "Launching Our Future" and she discussed her vision and advancements for aerospace technology, as well as why diversity and the inclusion of women are necessary to advance as a society.

== Personal life ==
Shotwell is married to Robert Shotwell, an engineer at NASA's Jet Propulsion Laboratory. She has two children from a previous marriage with Leon Gurevich.

Shotwell owns a ranch in Texas, which she considers to be her "home office."

== Honors and awards ==
- 2012: Women in Technology International Hall of Fame
- 2017: Satellite Executive of the Year
- 2018: Forbes' America's Top 50 Women In Tech
- 2018: Business Insider, Most powerful female engineer
- 2020: Time 100 most influential people
- 2020: Satellite Executive of the Year
- 2020: Elected a member of the National Academy of Engineering
- 2023: Ranked 28th most powerful woman in the world by Forbes
- 2023: Ranked 54th on Fortune's list of Most Powerful Women
- 2026: Ranked 32nd on Fortune's list of the 100 Most Powerful Women in Business
