= Downrange =

Downrange, or down range, is the horizontal distance traveled by a spacecraft, or the spacecraft's horizontal distance from the launch site. More often, it is used as an adverb or adjective specifying the direction of that travel being measured in a horizontal direction.

In military slang, downrange is a term for being deployed overseas, usually in a war zone. It is also the name of a comic strip published in the newspaper Stars and Stripes. It can also refer to the direction of fire: away from the source and in the direction of the target.

In the 1960s and 1970s, a down range tracking system existed at Gulkula, in the Northern Territory of Australia, to track rockets launched from the Woomera Test Range in South Australia.
