= List of spacecraft manufacturers =

== History ==
During the early years of spaceflight only nation states had the resources to develop and fly spacecraft. Both the U.S. space program and Soviet space program were operated using mainly military (ex–air force) pilots as astronauts. During this period, no commercial space launches were available to private operators, and no private organization was able to offer space launches.

In the 1980s, the European Space Agency created Arianespace, the world's first commercial space transportation company, and, following the Challenger disaster, the American government deregulated the American space transportation market as well. In the 1990s the Russian government sold their majority stake in RSC Energia to private investors (although it has recently renationalized the Russian space sector in 2013–2014.) These events for the first time allowed private organizations to purchase, develop and offer space launch services; beginning the period of private spaceflight in the late-1980s and early-1990s.

== Satellite manufacturers ==
Top 10 satellite manufacturers for 2024:

Company	Location	No of satellites launched	Comments
Airbus Defence and Space	Europe (France/Germany/Spain/United Kingdom)		formerly Astrium
OHB SE	Europe (Germany/Italy/Luxembourg/Sweden/France/Belgium)		
Boeing Defense, Space & Security	United States		formerly Boeing Integrated Defense Systems
INVAP	Argentina	6	INVAP is developing new satellites ARSAT-3 SAOCOM SABIA-Mar
JSC Information Satellite Systems	Russia	1200	formerly NPO PM
Lockheed Martin Space	United States		
Northrop Grumman	United States		formerly Orbital ATK
Raytheon	United States		One of worlds largest space sensor providers.
Maxar Space	United States	285	formerly Space Systems Loral, formally SSL, subsidiary of Maxar Technologies
Thales Alenia Space	Europe (France/Italy/United Kingdom/Spain/Belgium/Germany/Poland)		formerly Alcatel Alenia Space

In addition to those above, the following companies have successfully built and launched (smaller) satellite platforms:

Company	Location	No of satellites launched	Comments
AeroAstro, Inc.	United States		Closed
Argotec	Italy		CubeSats and Small Satellites
Astranis	United States	1	Geostationary & Small-scale Satellites
British Aerospace	United Kingdom		purchased Marconi Electronic Systems, to form BAE Systems
CBERS	Brazil China	5	
EnduroSat	Europe (Bulgaria)		CubeSats and Nanosatellites
Fairchild Space and Electronics Division	United States		sold to Matra Marconi Space, then sold to Orbital Sciences Corporation
Fokker Space & Systems	Netherlands		then Dutch Space, now part of EADS Astrium Satellites
GAUSS Srl	Italy	9	CubeSats and Small Satellites (<50 kg)
General Electric	United States		then merged into Martin Marietta, now part of Lockheed Martin
Hawker Siddeley Dynamics	United Kingdom		now part of EADS Astrium Satellites
Dhruva Space	India		Nano Satellites (>8 to <35 kg)
GomSpace	Denmark, Luxembourg, Sweden		Nano and Micro Satellites (1 to 50 kg) for global tracking, Earth observation and science, communications, constellations, Internet-of-Things, defence and security, and deep-space missions.
Hera Systems	United States	1	Smart satellite bus provider. Spacecraft manufacturing and integration services, for small satellites (50–250 kg).
Hughes Aircraft	United States		purchased by Boeing
IHI Corporation	Japan		
In-Space Missions	United Kingdom		Launching first satellite in Q2 2020
Innovative Solutions in Space	Netherlands	490	CubeSats
Libre Space Foundation	Greece	3	CubeSats, PocketQubes
NPO Lavochkin	Russia		
Mitsubishi Heavy Industries	Japan		
Northrop Grumman Space Technology	United States		
NanoAvionics	United States	90	CubeSats and Small Sats
Pumpkin, Inc.	United States		CubeSat Kit
OneWeb	United Kingdom	640	OneWeb satellite constellation
Planet Labs	United States	≥592	Earth observation satellite constellation
Philco Ford	United States		then Ford Aerospace, now Space Systems/Loral
QinetiQ Space N.V.	Belgium	3	then Verhaert Space
Reflex Aerospace	Germany	1	SmallSats (75–500 kg), SIGI, launched January 2025.
Rockwell	United States		purchased by Boeing
RKK Energiya	Russia		produced Sputnik 1
Satrec Initiative	Korea	5	
SPAR Aerospace	Canada	8	bought by MacDonald Dettwiler
Sierra Space	United States		formerly SpaceDev, owned by Sierra Space
SpaceX	United States	6700	largest commercial satellite constellation operator in the world with the Starlink constellation
Spectrum Astro	United States		bought by General Dynamics
Surrey Satellite Technology Ltd	United Kingdom		now part of Airbus Defence & Space
Swales Aerospace	United States		bought by Alliant Techsystems, now Orbital ATK
TRANSPACE Technologies	India		On-Board Satellite Systems Fabrication, Testing and Reliability Analysis
TRW	United States	nearly 200	now part of Northrop Grumman Space Technology
TsSKB-Progress	Russia		manufacturer of Bion-M, Foton-M, Resurs-P and Persona
Xovian	India		Nanosat and services
York Space Systems	United States	1	Up to 250 kg spacecraft production and launch services
Yuzhnoye Design Bureau	Ukraine		

== Launch vehicle manufacturers and providers of third party services ==
Company	Location	No. of successful launches	Comments
Arianespace	Europe (France/Germany/Italy/Belgium/Switzerland/Sweden/Spain/Netherlands/Norway/Denmark)	244/256	Ariane (rocket family)
Delft Aerospace Rocket Engineering	Netherlands		Suborbital student-built sounding rockets
ISRO	India	65/72	PSLV, GSLV, LVM3, SSLV
COSMOS International	Russia/Germany		commercialises the Kosmos-3M launcher
Eurockot Launch Services	Europe (Germany/France/United Kingdom/Spain/Netherlands/Russia)	29/31	owned by EADS Astrium
International Launch Services	United States; Russia	97/100	
Iranian Space Agency	Iran	4/15	
Innospace	South Korea		Successfully done Sub-Orbital Launch (HANBIT-TLV Mar. 2023) Under Development (Hybrid Rocket) HANBIT-Nano HANBIT-Micro HANBIT-Mini
ISC Kosmotras	Russia/Ukraine/Kazakhstan		
Mitsubishi Heavy Industries	Japan	81/85	
Northrop Grumman	United States	81/90	manufacturer of Antares, Minotaur and Pegasus
PLD Space	Spain		manufacturer of Miura 1 and Miura 5
Rocket Lab	New Zealand/United States	46/50	manufacturer of Electron launch vehicle
Space One	Japan		manufacturer of the KAIROS launch vehicle
SpaceX	United States	661/669	Falcon 1, Falcon 9, Falcon Heavy and Starship
Sea Launch	United States/Russia/Ukraine/Norway	32/36	provider of Sea Launch and Land Launch service
Makeyev Rocket Design Bureau	Russia		commercialises the Volna and Shtil' launchers
NPO Mashinostroyeniya	Russia		commercialises the Strela launcher
Starsem	Europe (Germany/France/United Kingdom/Spain/Netherlands/Italy/Belgium/Switzerland/Sweden/Norway/Denmark/ and Russia)		commercialises the Soyuz launcher
The Spaceship Company	United States		Reusable spaceship launched from the White Knight Aircraft for space tourism and zero-g experimentation
TsSKB-Progress	Russia		manufacturer of Soyuz launch vehicle
United Launch Alliance	United States	147/148	
Vaya Space	United States		formerly known as Rocket Crafters, manufacturer of Dauntless
United Start Launch	United States; Russia		commercialises the Start-1 launcher
Virgin Galactic	United States		Space Tourism Using 'The Spaceship Company spacecraft
Virgin Orbit	United States / United Kingdom	4/6	manufacturer of LauncherOne air-launched launch vehicle
Blue Origin	United States		manufacturer of the New Shepard suborbital rocket and New Glenn
Independence-X Aerospace	Malaysia		manufacturer of DNLV launch vehicle
Borneo SubOrbitals	Malaysia		manufacturer of unnamed suborbital rocket
Relativity Space	United States	0/1	95% 3D printed rocket
Stoke Space	United States		Aerospike 2nd stage engine

Commercial wings of national space agencies:

- Aerospace Industrial Development Corporation (AIDC) and Taiwan Aerospace Industry Association (TAIA) Taiwan
- Antrix Corporation and NSIL India
- China Aerospace Science and Technology Corporation China

== Lander, rover and probe manufacturers ==
Company	Location	No. of probes launched	Comments
Brown Engineering Company	Huntsville, AL United States		Rover for Apollo lunar program
China National Space Administration	China		for Chang'e 3 program in 2013
Deep Space Industries	Mountain View, CA United States		
Lavochkin	Russia		rovers for Lunokhod 1
NASA JPL	United States		for ATHLETE lunar missions, Mars Pathfinder, Opportunity and Spirit rover
ISRO	India		Chandrayaan-1, Chandrayaan-2, Mars Orbiter Mission
Planetary Resources	Redmond, WA United States		Arkyd-100 for asteroid searching

== Spacecraft component manufacturers ==
Company	Location	Production	Notes
Orbital Machines AS	Trondheim, Norway and Berlin, Germany	Electric propellant pumps for launch vehicles and spacecraft	
Comat	Flourens, France	Space Equipment mechanism expert, from design to MAIT (Manufacturing, Assembly, Integration, Test). SmallSat off-the-shelf solutions including ADCS (reaction wheels range), SADM, deployable structure and electric propulsion (Plasma Jet Pack)	COMAT's reaction wheels and deployable antennas have been selected for use on the upcoming Kineis IoT constellation.
Astro- und Feinwerktechnik Adlershof GmbH	Berlin, Germany	Design, Manufacturing, Assembly, Integration and Verification of small satellite buses (TET-1, launched July 2012) and components. Attitude control components (reaction wheels, gyro system, GPS receiver, magnetometer) Supplier of space systems and ISS payload NightPod	
Bradford Space	New York, NY	Supplier of green propulsion systems, rocket engines, Sun sensors, reaction wheels, acceleration measurement units, and astronaut workstations.	Over 100 thrusters in-space
Dynetics	Madison, AL United States		used on Sundancer and Ares I
Tethers Unlimited, Inc.	Seattle, WA United States	De-Orbiting Devices, Deployable Solar Arrays, Propulsion Systems, Radio Communications, and Robotics	
RUAG Space	Switzerland	Structures, Fairings, Mechanisms, Opto-Electronics	
AB 360 Space	United States	manufacturer of CLEPS-C100 Combined electric Propulsion systems, Adjustable Thruster Engines for Mars travel	
GAUSS Srl	Rome, Italy	Complete Space Platforms, Nanosatellites Structures and Deployers, OBDH, EPS, Radio Communications, Solar Panels and Groundstation systems	
GomSpace	Denmark, Luxembourg, Sweden	1U to 16U platforms and structures, propulsion systems, software-defined radio, S-/X-/VHF band antennas, ADCS suite, electrical power systems, solar panels, on-board computers, ground equipment etc.	
Andrews Space	Seattle, WA United States		
Jena-Optronik	Jena, Germany	Attitude and Orbit Control Systems (AOCS) sensors: star sensors, Sun sensors, rendezvous- and docking sensors; Optical space instruments and components: multi-spectral imager (e.g. JSS 56 for RapidEye satellite constellation), efficient radiometer (e.g. METimage), electronic as well as opto-mechanical subsystems and components for operational Earth observation (e.g. for Copernicus Sentinel missions)	
Pumpkin, Inc	San Francisco, CA United States	CubeSat Kits	
Mynaric	Munich Germany	Laser communication equipment for airborne and spaceborne communication networks, so called constellations.	
Kongsberg Defence & Aerospace	Kongsberg Norway	Kongsberg Adaptive Rotational Mechanism Assembly [KARMA] in configuration as Solar Array Drive Mechanism (SADM), used on Rosetta (spacecraft), Mars Express, Venus Express, Sentinel 1, Sentinel 3 and BepiColombo MTM. Drive electronics for Sentinel 1 and BepiColombo MTM. Booster attachment struts, including separation function, for Ariane 5.	
Production Corporation Polyot	Russia		
Rocketstar Robotics Inc	Camarillo, CA United States	Space Interferometry Mission Optical Shutter Mechanisms	
Sierra Space	United States		formerly SpaceDev, owned by Sierra Space
Clyde Space	Glasgow, Scotland	Power System Electronics, Batteries, Solar Panels, Attitude Control Systems	Acquired by ÅAC Microtec
Astro Aerospace	Carpinteria, CA United States	Deployable mechanisms, spacecraft structures, AstroMesh deployable reflector, deployable booms, large and small aperature mesh reflector antennas, STEM (Storable Tubular Extendable Member), hinge mechanisms,	A special business unit of Northrop Grumman
TRANSPACE Technologies	Bangalore, KA India	On-Board Satellite Sub-Systems Fabrication, Testing, Reliability Analysis and PCB Design	Approved Vendor for ISRO Satellite Center, India
RadioBro Corporation	Huntsville, Alabama United States	Small Spacecraft Communications, Flight Readiness Testing, Training Services	
Howco Additive Manufacturing	Houston, Texas, United States	3D Printing Aerospace Components in In718 and Titanium	
Solar MEMS Technologies	Spain	Sun Sensors for Satellites	
krypton technology solutions	United States	Small Spacecraft components, on-orbit servicing,1U to 24U spacecraft buses	
CisLunar Industries	United States	Power supplies for electric propulsion systems and space hardware	

== Propulsion manufacturers ==
Company name	Country	Engine	Engine type	Comments
Dawn Aerospace	Netherlands	B20, B1, SatDrive, Cubedrive	Bi-Propellant, Cold Gass	Nitrous Oxide based, turnkey propulsion systems
ArianeGroup	Lampoldshausen, Germany	S10, S20, S200, S400 CHT-1N, CHT-20N, CHT-400N RIT-10, RIT-2x	propellant and Monopropellant Thrusters, Gridded Ion Thrusters	Main manufacturer for Propulsion Systems, Equipments and Services in Europe, serving major space projects like ATV, ORION-ESM, ExoMars, JUICE, MTG, GEO and EO satellites with Propulsion Solutions.
Comat	Flourens, France	Plasma Jet Pack	Vacuum Arc thruster; Modular installation (PPSU + Nozzles)	To be used on Isispace and U-space platforms for French and European missions. Modular Thruster with up to 4 nozzles per PPSCU.
AB 360 Space	Washington DC, United States	CLEPS X-100, CLEPS C100	hybrid Thrusters, Combined Liquid Electric Propulsion Systems, Methane/ Oxygen Ion Thrusters	Uses Electric and Liquid Propulsion simultaneously for space propulsion for LEO/MEOsatellites
Moog-ISP (In Space Propulsion)	Westcott, Buckinghamshire United Kingdom Niagara Falls, NY United States	All Forms of Chemical Propulsion including Main Apogee Engines and AOCS Thrusters	Bipropellant and Monopropellant Product Families Include: LEROS, MONARC Thruster, LTT Thruster	Division of Moog Inc.
Bradford Space	New York, NY	LMP-103s thrusters, Water based thrusters	LMP-103s green monopropellant propulsion systems & thrusters, COMET water based propulsion systems	>100 thrusters on flight satellites
Busek	Natick, Massachusetts United States	BHT-200, BHT-1500, BHT-20k, BET-1, BmP-220, BIT-1, BIT-3, BIT-7, uPPT-3	Hall-effect thruster, Gridded Ion, Electrospray, micro Pulsed Plasma, Green Monopropellant, Electrothermal, Hollow Cathodes, Field Emission Cathode	TacSat-2, FalconSat-5, FalconSat-6, ST-7/LISA Pathfinder. Licensed technology for BPT-4000 aboard AEHF 1, AEHF 2, AEHF 3. Propulsion options ranging from CubeSats to GEO Communications Satellites to Asteroid Redirect Mission Spacecraft.
Aerojet Rocketdyne	Rancho Cordova, California United States	Numerous	liquid rocket engine, Solid rocket engine, Hall-effect thruster, Gridded Ion thruster.	
Hanwha Aerospace	South Korea	KRE-075, KRE-007 and Monopropellant Thrusters	Bipropellant, Monopropellant and Motor	Hanwha aerospace manufacturing liquid rocket engine for KSLV-II and monopropellant enginesd spacecraft (Lunar Orbiter, KOMPSAT series, etc.). The engines are co-developed with KARI.
American Rocket Company	United States		hybrid rocket	intellectual property acquired by SpaceDev
CU Aerospace	Champaign, IL United States	PUC, CHIPS, PPT-11	MCD / Resistojet / PPT	Small satellite / CubeSat Propulsion Modules
VIPER			liquid rocket engine	reusable rocket engine
Ad Astra Rocket Company	Webster, TX United States	VASIMR	magnetoplasma	may be used for future Mars missions
Enpulsion GmbH	Wiener Neustadt, Austria	Propulsion Systems for Cubesats, Small Sats, and Medium/Large Satellites	Field Emission Electric Propulsion	Enpulsion is commercializing a technology that has been developed for ESA science missions for more than 10 years.
PLD Space	Spain	TREPEL family		used on Miura Rockets
Reaction Engines Ltd.	Oxfordshire, England United Kingdom	SABRE	combined cycle precooled jet engine and closed cycle rocket engine	planned to be used in Skylon
LIA Aerospace Ltd.	England United Kingdom	KX11	Pressure Fed, bipropellant, green, non-toxic, storable regen cooled	used in Zonda 1.0
Sierra Space	United States	VR35K-A	hybrid rocket, liquid rocket engine	Commercial space subsidiary of Sierra Nevada Corporation
SpaceDev	Poway, CA United States		hybrid rocket	acquired by Sierra Space; used on SpaceShipOne and SpaceShipTwo
SpaceX	Hawthorne, California, United States	Merlin / Raptor / Draco / Kestrel	liquid rocket engine	used on SpaceX rockets and spacecraft (Falcon, Starship, Dragon)
ArianeGroup	Vernon, France	Vinci / Viking / Vulcain / HM7B	liquid rocket engine	used on Ariane rockets
NPO Energomash	Russia		liquid rocket engine	used on R-7, Molniya, Soyuz, Energia, Zenit, Atlas III, Atlas V, Angara, Antares
KBKhA	Russia		liquid rocket engine	used on Soyuz, Proton, Energia
KBKhM	Russia		liquid rocket engine	used on Vostok, Voskhod, Zenit, Soyuz, Progress, Salyut 1, Salyut 4, Salyut 6, Salyut 7, Mir Core Module, Zvezda, GSLV Mk I
NIIMash	Russia		liquid rocket engine	used on Almaz, Buran, Briz-M
TsNIIMash	Russia			used on STEX
Kuznetsov Design Bureau	Russia		liquid rocket engine	used on N1, Soyuz-2-1v, Antares
OKB Fakel	Russia		Hall-effect thruster	used on SMART-1, LS-1300
Proton-PM	Russia		liquid rocket engine	used on Proton, Angara
Keldysh Research Center	Russia			
Voronezh Mechanical Plant	Russia		liquid rocket engine	used on Vostok, Voskhod, Molniya, Soyuz, Proton, Energia, Luna
Yuzhnoye Design Office / Yuzhmash	Ukraine	RD-8; RD-843; RD-855; RD-856 etc.	Oxygen+kerosene and N_{2}0_{4}+UDMH liquid rocket engine; Solid rocket engine; thrusters; Hall-effect thruster; ammonia jet propulsion system; gas-jet propulsion system	used on: Vega, Zenit, Cyclone and lot of soviet missiles; Okean-O, Sich-1, EgyptSat 1 and many Soviet spacecraft
Independence-X Aerospace	Malaysia	ID-1, ID-2, ID-3 and unnamed 2-stage rocket engine for DNLV	solid rocket motor and liquid rocket engine	used on ID-1, ID-2 and DNLV rocket
Borneo SubOrbitals	Malaysia		hybrid rocket	used on yet-to-be-named rocket
Apollo Fusion	United States	ACE, ACE Max	Hall-effect thruster	To be used on Spaceflight, Inc.'s Sherpa-LTE space tug
Benchmark Space Systems	United States	Starling, Halcyon, Peregrine	Warm gas thruster, High-test peroxide thruster, Hypergolic thruster	To be used on Spaceflight, Inc.'s Sherpa-LTC space tug
ThrustMe	France	NPT30, I2T5	Gridded ion thruster, Cold gas thruster	first in-orbit demonstration of an electric propulsion system powered by iodine

== Manned spacecraft manufacturers ==
Company	Country	Manufactured
Airbus Defence and Space (Airbus DS)		Columbus laboratory module; Orion European Service Module
Axiom Space		Axiom Hab One space station module; privately operated Axiom space station
Blue Origin		Blue Moon lunar landers; developing the Orbital Reef space station with Sierra Space
Boeing	United States	Developing the Artemis Gateway space station for cislunar operations
China Academy of Space Technology (CAST)	China	Shenzhou crewed spacecraft and Tianzhou cargo spacecraft
China Aerospace Science and Technology Corporation	China	Shenzhou crewed spacecraft, Tianzhou cargo spacecraft, and space station modules
Dynetics		Prime contractor for Artemis Human Landing System (HLS)
ILC Dover		Shelters used for Orbit
Lockheed Martin Space	United States	Orion crewed spacecraft
Mitsubishi Heavy Industries	Japan	HTV Cargo Vehicle
Voyager Technologies formerly Nanoracks LLC		Developing technology to repurpose spent launch vehicle upper stages into manned orbital outposts
Northrop Grumman	United States	Developing the Habitation and Logistics Outpost (HALO) for NASA’s Lunar Gateway; developing the lunar transfer element to take astronauts to and from the lunar surface
Sierra Space	United States	
SpaceX	United States	Manufacturer of the Dragon capsule, which can transport people and cargo to and from LEO; developing the Starship spacecraft to transport crew and cargo on lunar and interplanetary missions

== See also ==
- List of private spaceflight companies including only companies with primarily private funding and missions ("NewSpace")
- Russian aerospace industry
