= Bulent Altan =

Turkish-American aerospace executive and engineer

- Born: Emin Bülent Altan; June 5, 1977 (age 49); Istanbul, Turkey
- Education: Technical University of Munich (Dipl); Stanford University (MS)
- Occupations: SpaceX (2004–2014); SpaceX (2016–2017); Mynaric (2017–2023); Alpine Space Ventures (since 2020)
- Engineering career
- Significant design: Falcon 1; Falcon 9; Dragon; Starlink

Bulent Altan is a Turkish-American aerospace executive and engineer, known for his significant contributions to SpaceX, an American aerospace manufacturer and space transportation services company headquartered in Hawthorne, California. He was also CEO of laser communications manufacturer Mynaric and is founding partner of venture capital firm Alpine Space Ventures.

== Early life and education ==
Altan was born in Istanbul, Turkey, and attended an Austrian middle- and high school in the city. At the age of 18, he moved to Germany and began his studies at the Technical University of Munich that he concluded with a Diplom in Computer Science in 2001. He furthered his education at Stanford University in California where he gained a Master of Science in Aerospace Engineering in 2004.

== Career ==
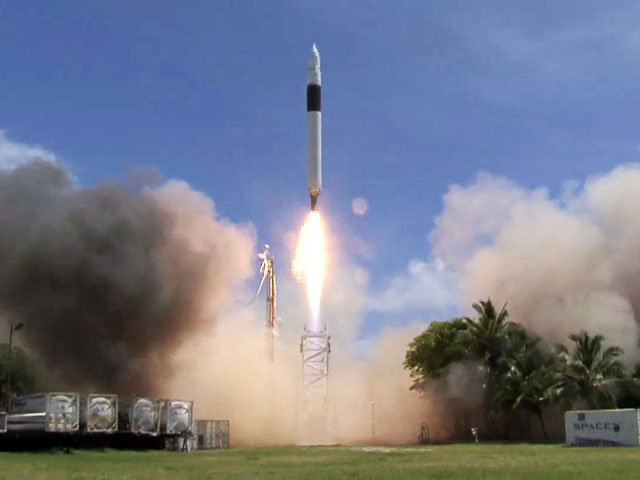
Bulent Altan designed the avionics systems of the Falcon 1 rocket.

=== SpaceX – Falcon 1 (2004–2009) ===
Upon the end of Bulent Altan's studies and while working on a cubesat project at Stanford he was approached by Elon Musk to join SpaceX. As technical manager initially and later director he led the company's avionics, guidance, navigation, and control (GNC) team and was instrumental to the Falcon 1 launch campaign on Omelek Island that resulted in the first privately funded, liquid-fueled spacecraft to reach orbit.

=== Space X – Falcon 9 & Dragon (2009–2014) ===
After initial successes and while working on Falcon 9 Altan became first senior director and then VP of Avionics & GNC and hence one of the four technical vice presidents of SpaceX working alongside Tom Mueller (VP Propulsion), Timothy Buzza (VP of Launch) and Mark Juncosa (VP of Structures) as well as VP of Assurance Hans Koenigsmann. He later went on to work with his team on the Dragon capsule used to resupply the International Space Station (ISS) with cargo until he first left SpaceX in 2014.

=== Space X – Starlink (2016–2017) ===
Altan joined SpaceX again in 2016 to work on the company's first satellites for the Starlink program. As VP of Satellite Mission Assurance he oversaw the development of the technology, the implementation of the business cases and markets until he eventually left SpaceX at the end of 2017.

=== Mynaric (2017–2023) ===
In 2019, Altan's professional journey led him to laser communications manufacturer Mynaric. Under Altan's leadership, Mynaric pivoted towards the United States as a key market, opened production facilities in Germany and the United States, and established itself as a dominant supplier of optical communications terminals for the Space Development Agency's Proliferated Warfighter Space Architecture, a large global satellite constellation. In 2021, Altan led the company to and through its initial public offering in the United States (Nasdaq: MYNA) before, in 2023, he resigned from his CEO position to become part of the supervisory board of Mynaric.

=== Other roles and ventures ===
During his break from SpaceX between 2014 and 2016, Altan also worked for Airbus Defense and Space and was a partner at TechFounders, a matchmaker between start-ups and established corporations in the ecosystem of the Technical University of Munich. He was one of the first investors in launch vehicle company Isar Aerospace, becoming their chairman and is one of the two founding partners of the venture capital firm Alpine Space Ventures.

== Personal life ==
Bulent Altan identifies as a Turkish-American national though he calls Germany often his second home. Besides English and Turkish, he is also fluent in German and divides his time between Los Angeles and Munich.

== Trivia ==
Bulent Altan was initially reluctant to join SpaceX because of his wife's position at Google in the San Francisco Bay Area. Unbeknownst to Altan, Elon Musk reached out to Google's co-founder, Larry Page, to facilitate a relocation for his wife to Los Angeles near SpaceX's headquarter in Hawthorne, California. Musk then surprised Altan with this gesture during their interview, which convinced Altan to join SpaceX.

Altan is an avid chef and regularly cooked his own interpretation of a “Turkish goulash” for the launch team at the Kwajalein Atoll during the initial launch campaign of the Falcon 1. His recipe has been reproduced in Eric Berger's book “Lift Off”.

== See also ==
- SpaceX
- SpaceX Falcon 1
- SpaceX Falcon 9
- SpaceX Dragon
- SpaceX Starlink
- Avionics
- Elon Musk
- Hans Koenigsmann
- Tom Mueller
- Mynaric
- Laser communication in space
