= NanoSail-D =

Satellite designed to test the concept of solar sails that deployed unsuccessfully

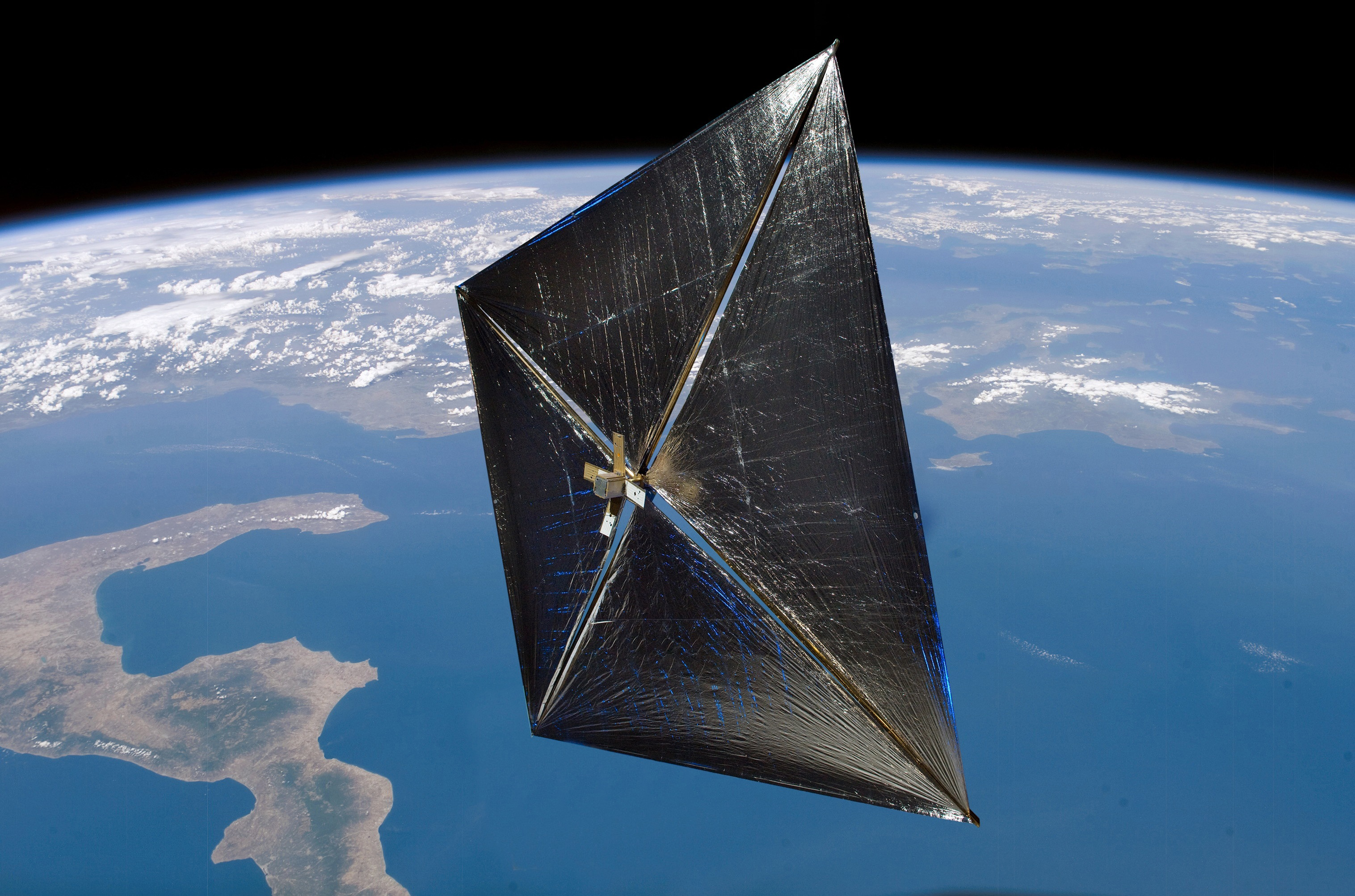
- Artist concept of NanoSail-D in space
- Mission type: Technology demonstration
- Operator: NASA
- Mission duration: Failed to orbit 7 days (planned)

Spacecraft properties
- Bus: 3U CubeSat
- Manufacturer: NASA Ames Research Center; NASA Marshall Space Flight Center
- Launch mass: 4 kg (8.8 lb)
- Dimensions: 30 cm × 10 cm × 10 cm (11.8 in × 3.9 in × 3.9 in)
- Power: Batteries

Start of mission
- Launch date: 3 August 2008, 03:34 UTC
- Rocket: Falcon 1 #3
- Launch site: Kwajalein Atoll, Omelek
- Contractor: SpaceX

Orbital parameters
- Reference system: Geocentric orbit
- Regime: Low Earth orbit
- Perigee altitude: 330 km (210 mi)
- Apogee altitude: 685 km (426 mi)
- Inclination: 9.0°
- Period: 90.0 minutes

NanoSail-D was a small satellite which was intended for use by NASA's Ames Research Center to study the deployment of a solar sail in space. It was a three-unit CubeSat measuring 30 cm × 10 cm × 10 cm (11.8 in × 3.9 in × 3.9 in), with a mass of 4 kg (8.8 lb). The satellite was lost shortly after launch due to a problem with the launch vehicle carrying it; however, a replacement, NanoSail-D2, was launched in 2010 to complete its mission.

== Spacecraft ==
NanoSail-D was to have been deployed on the third flight of the Falcon 1 launch vehicle, which was launched from Omelek Island at 03:34 UTC on 3 August 2008. One of two CubeSats aboard, along with PRESat, it was a secondary payload to the Trailblazer which was to have been operated by the Operationally Responsive Space Office of the United States Department of Defense. The launch was conducted by SpaceX, and also carried a space burial payload (Celestis-07) for Celestis. Two minutes and forty seconds after launch, the spent first stage of the rocket was jettisoned; however, unexpected residual thrust caused it to recontact the second stage, which resulted in the rocket being thrown off course. Unable to achieve orbit, the rocket and payloads fell into the Pacific Ocean.

NanoSail-D was to have been operated in a low Earth orbit with a perigee of 330 km (210 mi), an apogee of 685 km (426 mi) and 9.0° of inclination. It would have been operational for around seven days, after which time it would have been expected to run out of power. Its solar sail had an area of 10 m^{2} (110 sq ft). The satellite was developed and tested in four months.

NanoSail-D2 was built as a ground spare for NanoSail-D. Following the launch failure of NanoSail-D in August 2008, NanoSail-D2 was launched on a Minotaur IV launch vehicle in November 2010, and deployed from the FASTSAT satellite.

== See also ==
- List of CubeSats

Solar sail CubeSats

- LightSail-1
- Near-Earth Asteroid Scout
