= TacSat-1 =

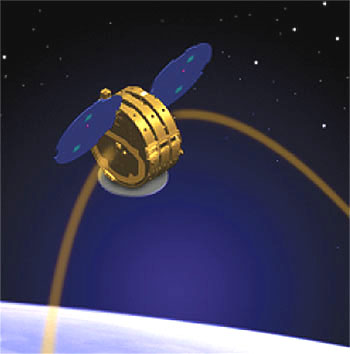
- TacSat-1 imaging satellite
- Names: TacSat-1A
- Mission type: Technology, Communications
- Operator: United States Naval Research Laboratory
- Mission duration: 1 year (planned); Never launched

Spacecraft properties
- Spacecraft: TacSat
- Bus: MicroStar (triple)
- Manufacturer: Orbital Sciences Corporation
- Launch mass: 108 kg (238 lb)

Start of mission
- Launch date: 2007 (Never launched)
- Rocket: Falcon 1
- Launch site: Omelek Island
- Contractor: SpaceX
- Entered service: Never launched

Orbital parameters
- Reference system: Geocentric orbit (planned)
- Regime: Low Earth orbit
- Altitude: 500 km (310 mi)
- Inclination: 64.0°
- Period: 90.0 minutes

TacSat-1 was an experimental satellite built by the Naval Research Laboratory (NRL) on behalf of the United States Department of Defense (DoD) Office of Force Transformation (OFT). It was the planned payload of the sixth launch of the SpaceX Falcon 1. It was however never launched into space. The second satellite in the series, TacSat-2, launched before TacSat-1 and this led to the cancellation of TacSat-1's launch.

TacSat-1 would have carried a variety of experimental payloads. Much of the payload software was implemented through the use of bash scripts operating on the "Copperfield-2" general-purpose computer system aboard the spacecraft.

== Purpose ==
The TacSat series of experimental spacecraft are designed to allow military commanders on a battlefield to request and obtain imagery and other data from a satellite as it passes overhead. Collected data will be delivered to field commanders in minutes rather than hours or days. The sensor on TacSat-1 could collect color images sharp enough to distinguish ground objects as small as 1 meter in diameter.

== Launch ==
TacSat-1 was initially planned for launch in January 2004, but delays in Falcon 1 becoming operational precluded this date. It was initially scheduled to fly on the maiden flight of the Falcon 1, but technical problems led to another Falcon 1, with FalconSat-2, launching first. Following the failure of this launch, it was moved to the third flight, to allow a demonstration launch to precede it. The failure of the demonstration flight led to further delays. In August 2007, the Pentagon announced that the launch of TacSat-1 was canceled due to the completion of most of its mission requirements by AFRL's previously launched TacSat-2. In September 2008, this decision was reversed, and it was reported that TacSat-1 would be launched by the sixth Falcon 1, in 2009, and be called TacSat-1A. This revamped mission was later cancelled again when TacSat-2 proved all the things TacSat-1 was supposed to.

== Systems ==
The TacSat series of satellites use commercial or available launchers, and largely off-the-shelf components, in order to reduce costs.

=== Satellite bus ===
The TacSat-1 spacecraft was based on Orbital Sciences Corporation (OSC) MicroStar (triple) satellite bus, also used for the Orbcomm communications constellation. TacSat-1 inherited its avionic bus from an unlaunched Orbcomm-satellite.

== Developers ==
Apart from the Naval Research Laboratory (NRL), other organizations participating included:

- DoD Space Test Program (Space and Missile Systems Center's Space Development and Test Wing)
- DoD Operationally Responsive Space Office
- Army Space Program Office
- Air Force Space Command
- Space Innovation and Development Center
- NASA
- Jet Propulsion Laboratory (JPL)
