= SI-200 =

South Korean satellite bus

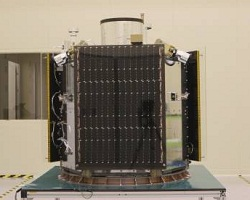
SI-200 Bus

The SI-200 satellite bus was a model of satellite, based on the Malaysian RazakSAT, produced by the South Korean Satrec Initiative. The bus was suitable for small satellites where the accommodation of Earth observation or other scientific payloads is required, and was used on the Emirati remote sensing satellite DubaiSat-1 launched in 2009.

The SI-200 is based on the bus technology of the Malaysian RazakSAT (originally MACSAT), which Satrec Initiative developed jointly with Astronautic Technology (M) Sdn. Bhd. (ATSB) for Malaysia's national space programme. It is designed for small satellite missions in low Earth orbit and offers relatively large payload space for electro-optical Earth observation, telecommunications and space science payloads. In a 2009 paper, Satrec Initiative described the SI-200 as a 200 kg mini-satellite designed to be compatible with an optical imaging payload of 2.5 m ground sampling distance. The platform was optimised for a 300 mm optical push-broom camera with a 20 km swath, and it offers tilting of plus or minus 45 degrees and a 30 Mbps X-band downlink.

== Features ==
- Three-axis stabilized, accurate and agile attitude control for precise imaging operations.
- Dual redundancies are adapted where necessary in the system architecture design to increase reliability of the satellite system.
- Dimensions: 1.2 m in diameter and 1.35 m in height.
- Deck-and-longeron type structure permitting easy assembly and disassembly. The interface with the launch vehicle is made through an adapter bolted to the bottom of the structure. The mechanical interface with the electro-optical payload is provided through three points at the satellite middle deck.

Parameter	Feature	Remarks
Mass	< 200 kg	
Volume	Ø 1,200 x 1,250 mm	Hexagonal
Power Generation	330 W @ EOL	3 deployable panels
Attitude Control	3-axis stabilized	
TT&C Link	S-band	
Data Link	X-band	QPSK
Lifetime	5 years	

== Usage ==
RazakSAT was the first SI-200 to launch, on a Falcon-1 on 14 July 2009, and DubaiSat-1 followed on a Dnepr on 29 July 2009. On DubaiSat-1, gyroscopes and four reaction wheels used for attitude control were placed at the middle of the bus, while most other components sat on the bottom deck. The bus uses passive thermal control, while the camera payload and battery system use active thermal control, and the payload is thermally isolated from the bus. In May 2006, the Emirates Institution for Advanced Science and Technology (EIAST) awarded Satrec Initiative the contract for DubaiSat-1. DubaiSat-1's camera gave 2.5 m panchromatic and 5 m multispectral resolution, using a push-broom technique with a 20 km swath within a 720 km field of view.
