= Trailblazer (satellite) =

Technology demonstration satellite

- Mission type: Technology demonstration
- Operator: US Air Force; MDA
- COSPAR ID: 2008-F01
- Mission duration: Failed to orbit

Spacecraft properties
- Bus: MMB-100
- Manufacturer: SpaceDev

Start of mission
- Launch date: 3 August 2008, 03:34 UTC
- Rocket: Falcon 1 # 3
- Launch site: Kwajalein Atoll, Omelek
- Contractor: SpaceX

Orbital parameters
- Reference system: Geocentric orbit (planned)
- Regime: Low Earth orbit

Trailblazer was a technology demonstration satellite, which was to have been operated by the United States Air Force and the Missile Defense Agency.

== History ==
It was selected for launch under a "Jumpstart" contract, to demonstrate responsiveness, with the final payload being chosen less than a month ahead of the scheduled launch date, and was launched as the primary payload of the third Falcon 1, which failed just over two minutes after launch on 3 August 2008. Two previous Falcon 1 launches also failed to reach orbit, but the fourth succeeded although it only carried a dummy payload.

It was originally built for a canceled MDA project, and was based on a SpaceDev MMB-100 satellite bus. It was launched from Omelek Island, Kwajalein Atoll at 03:34 UTC. Several other payloads were to be launched aboard the same launch vehicle, including two CubeSats for NASA (PRESat and NanoSail-D), and a space burial (Celestis-07) payload for Celestis, which would have remained attached to the launch vehicle in low Earth orbit.
