= PnPSat-1 =

- PnPSat computer model
- Mission type: Technology
- Operator: AFRL

Spacecraft properties
- Manufacturer: SpaceWorks Inc

PnPSat-1 initiated in 2004 (also known as Plug-and-Play Satellite) is an experimental satellite built by the United States Air Force Research Laboratory. The spacecraft was the first choice for the third flight of the Falcon 1 rocket in August 2008, but was not selected because it was not completed at that time.

== Mission description ==
The primary mission is to demonstrate concepts of plug-and-play spacecraft development by successfully constructing and launching a spacecraft based on several technologies developed for that purpose.

== Spacecraft design ==
The design of the spacecraft centers on the idea of "smart" structural panels which are sealed aluminum panels which contain the necessary power and data electronics and harnessing. Components mounted on these panels are limited to devices which are too large to be contained inside a panel and payload devices.

The key to the design is AFRL's Space Plug-and-play Avionics (SPA) protocols and the Satellite Data Model (SDM) flight software. The SPA family of protocols provides the standardized communications interface between the flight computer system of the spacecraft and the various avionics and sensors. The SDM software performs the plug-and-play function for software and interfaces with the avionics and sensors using the SPA network.
