= RatSat =

Mass simulator on fourth Falcon 1 flight

- RatSat, with a SpaceX sticker and its mission logo
- Mission type: Launch demonstration
- Operator: SpaceX
- COSPAR ID: 2008-048A
- SATCAT no.: 33393
- Mission duration: 17 years, 9 months, 26 days (in orbit)

Spacecraft properties
- Manufacturer: SpaceX
- Launch mass: 165 kg (364 lb)
- Dimensions: 1.5 m (4.9 ft) in length

Start of mission
- Launch date: 28 September 2008, 23:15 UTC
- Rocket: Falcon 1
- Launch site: Omelek Island
- Contractor: SpaceX

Orbital parameters
- Regime: Low Earth orbit
- Perigee altitude: 617 kilometers (383 mi)
- Apogee altitude: 635 kilometers (395 mi)
- Inclination: 9.35°
- Period: 97.09 minutes
- Epoch: 24 January 2015, 18:58:23 UTC

RatSat or DemoSat is an aluminum mass simulator on the fourth flight of the Falcon 1 rocket, launched on 28 September 2008. Ratsat remained bolted to the second stage of the carrier rocket after reaching low Earth orbit. It is an aluminium alloy chamber in hexagonal prism shape with 1.5 m (5 ft) length.

The Falcon 1 launch that carried Ratsat to orbit was the first successful orbital launch of any privately funded and developed, liquid-propellant carrier rocket, the SpaceX Falcon 1, something only six nations had successfully accomplished previously.

The launch, identified as Falcon 1 Flight 4, was conducted by SpaceX, and also marked the first time the Falcon 1 rocket successfully achieved orbit, after three consecutive failures on the three previous launch attempts.

== Background ==
Prior to Ratsat's launch, three consecutive flights of the Falcon 1 rocket had ended in failure. In particular, during the third launch of the Falcon 1 in August 2008, the first stage of the rocket after stage separation exhibited residual thrust and slammed into its second stage, resulting in catastrophic damage to the second stage's Kestrel engine. Though the fix for the problem was simple – add a time delay between main engine cut off and stage separation – SpaceX was running out of money and there was much uncertainty as to whether or not there would be a fourth flight for the company. SpaceX's CEO, Elon Musk, was under immense stress financially and personally, as both of his ventures, SpaceX and Tesla Inc., were at risk of bankruptcy due to a series of failures. Compounding his financial stress was his recent divorce with Justine Musk - the resulting property settlement left him homeless, as well as having lost their first son due to SIDS.

== Preparation ==
=== Shipping to Omelek ===
Right after the third launch failure, Musk made an encouraging speech for the SpaceX employees and told them to launch another rocket in six weeks. According to Musk, this tight schedule was necessary or else the company would be overrun by operational fundings and at risk being in bankruptcy. The rocket was hastily built out of rocket spare parts in the factory.

The fourth launch of the Falcon 1 was supposed to deliver the Malaysian government's RazakSAT satellite, but the Malaysian government has backed out and no other customer was willing to launch on a thrice-failed rocket. Therefore, the SpaceX team had to make a non-functional aluminum boilerplate to simulate the rocket's payload. The boilerplate weighed 165 kg (364 lb) and was named "RatSat" after the last names of Jeff Richichi, Ray Amador and Chris Thompson, who were part of the company's structures team. The design for RatSat's logo was inspired by Ed Roth t-shirts, whom Thompson admired.

Normally, Falcon 1's first stage would have been shipped by container to Omelek Island, Kwajalein Atoll, U.S. (where SpaceX launched the rocket) and Falcon 1's second stage would fly out to the island using the Douglas DC-8 aircraft. The first stage was too big to be flown out using a DC-8. However, the tight schedule mandated the first stage to be shipped over air, so after scrambling with military contacts, a SpaceX employee was able to book a flight on the U.S. Air Force's Boeing C-17 Globemaster III with a price of $500,000. Being much larger than the DC-8, the C-17 can easily fit the rocket's first stage (which its dry mass weighs 1,800 kg (4,000 lb) compared to the C-17 carrying capacity of 77,000 kg or 170,000 lb) and twenty supporting employees.

Falcon 1's journey through the Pacific Ocean

On 3 September, the C-17 landed at the Los Angeles International Airport near SpaceX's headquarters, loaded up, and took off without issues. An intentional small opening in the Falcon 1's oxygen tank fuel pressurization line was made to equalize the rocket's internal pressure with the surroundings. This approach worked well enough for the rocket tanks to slowly release its pressure while the plane was ascending. However, when it was time for the plane to descend to Hawaii and the cabin depressurized, the small opening did not allow air to pass into the rocket tanks fast enough. Thus, the Falcon 1 imploded, right next to the supporting crew. Had SpaceX crews not been onboard the flight, the Falcon 1 would have been ditched into the sea.

With only 30 minutes of fuel left and the rocket continuing to crumble, the crew cut the shrink wraps with their knives and set to work fixing the problem. A member of the crew crawled inside the Falcon 1's interstage with a wrench and detached a pressurization line inside, allowing air to pass inside. The crumbling oxygen tank was inflated back to shape, though it had sustained damage to its structure. The C-17 landed at the Hickam Air Force Base, Hawaii at midnight. The next morning, the crew and rocket took off from Hawaii and landed on an airstrip in the Kwajalein Atoll. A barge then carried the first stage of the rocket to Omelek Island.

=== Rocket fixes and tests ===
Using a borescope, a slosh baffle was found detached from the tank body, and it was clear that the Falcon 1 needed a total disassembly. A 'proper' six-week long fixing procedure was proposed, but it was promptly rejected because by then, operational expenses would cause SpaceX to not have any funds left. Another solution suggesting shipping back the rocket to the headquarters was also not viable for the same reason. The only viable option was to disassemble the rocket on the island itself, within one week. After some hesitancy, the SpaceX team got to work. On September 5, Falcon 1's engine was removed first, by removing connectors and fuel lines and placing the engine on the wood block. After one and a half days, the entire first stage was completely disassembled.

While engineers at Omelek were working on the first stage, Thompson and Buzza (another engineer) flew back to Hawthorne on a Dassault Falcon 900. They loaded the plane with essential hardware and TEA-TEB ignition fluid, which is a substance that spontaneously combusts when in contact with air and for safety reasons is usually shipped by boat. Once touched down on the Kwajalein Atoll airstrip, they were told to leave the airplane until the next morning when the military crews would be available to unload supplies. Instead, Thompson and Buzza loaded the supplies on a truck and drove it to the barge dock, where they will be transported to Omelek. Now with Thompson and Buzza on-site, the SpaceX engineers reassembled the first stage and performed a wet dress rehearsal with liquid oxygen. There were concerns that the wrinkles on the first stage might cause a catastrophic explosion, but fortunately they were straightened out when the first stage was pressurized. To quote from Eric Berger's Liftoff: "They had broken virtually every rule in aerospace to pull the first stage together".

The now-repaired first stage was reconnected with the first stage engine, and the rocket performed a static fire test on 20 September. Launch preparations on 23 September led the ground crew to replace part of a pipeline supplying liquid oxygen to the second stage Kestrel engine. This work delayed the launch to 28 September.

== Launch ==
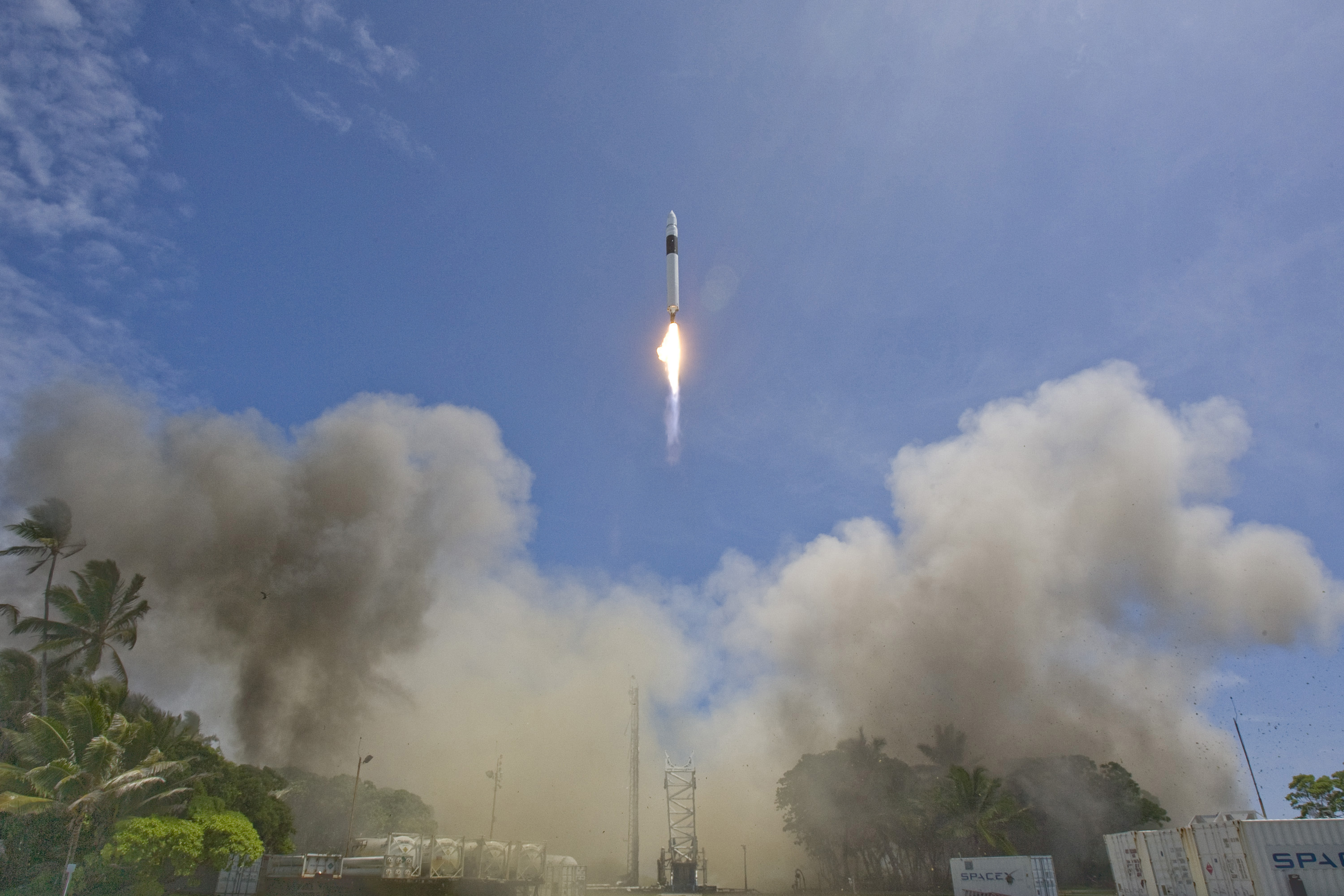
Launch of RatSat on Falcon 1's fourth flight

Falcon 1's flight four followed the same trajectory as the previous flight. No major changes were made to the rocket, other than increasing the time between first stage burnout and second stage separation. This minor change addressed the failure seen on the previous flight, recontact between the first and second stages, by dissipating residual thrust in the enhanced first stage engine in vacuum before separation.

Liftoff occurred from Omelek Island at 23:15 UTC on 28 September, 15 minutes into a five-hour launch window. If the launch had been scrubbed, it could have been conducted during the same window until 1 October. Nine minutes and 31 seconds after launch, the second stage engine shut down, after the vehicle reached orbit. The initial orbit was reported to be approximately 330 by 650 kilometres (210 mi × 400 mi). Following a coast period, the second stage restarted, and performed a successful second burn, resulting in a final orbit of 621 by 643 kilometres (386 mi × 400 mi) at 9.35° inclination.

== Aftermath ==
The launch of RatSat marked the first successful orbital launch of any privately funded and developed, liquid-propellant carrier rocket. After a short three-minutes speech by Musk, SpaceX employees partied at Tavern on Main and Purple Orchid, two bars that are close to SpaceX's headquarters. For the employees at the mission control room at Kwajalein, they monitored RatSat until the second stage's battery ran out of power. They locked the mission control room and biked towards the dock, where they waited for the backup crew from Meck island and celebrated at a local bar.

Even though SpaceX finally has achieved a successful orbital flight, Musk only has $30 million left and was unable to support both SpaceX and Tesla for two months. Contrary to popular belief, Falcon 1's flight 4 did not directly lead to more customer contracts. Through 2008, SpaceX launch manifest at the time only consisted of RazakSAT. Rather, it was NASA's Commercial Orbital Transportation Services and subsequent Commercial Resupply Services contracts that provided SpaceX much-needed fund to save it from bankruptcy.

Although SpaceX was working on concepts to recover the first stage of Falcon 1 using parachutes, they had not yet succeeded in doing so. Falcon 1 was subsequently retired from service after its fifth launch, with first stage recovery never having been accomplished successfully. The first stage of the successor rocket, the Falcon 9, would eventually fulfill and prove the viability of booster stage recovery.

== See also ==
- 2008 in spaceflight
