= FalconSAT =

Program within the United States Air Force Academy for building small satellites

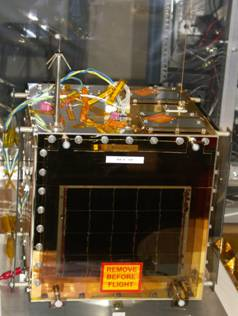
FalconSAT-1

FalconSAT is the United States Air Force Academy's (USAFA) small satellite engineering program. Satellites are designed, built, tested, and operated by Academy cadets. The project is administered by the USAFA Space Systems Research Center under the direction of the Department of Astronautics. Most cadets who work on the project are pursuing a bachelor of science degree in astronautical engineering, although students from other disciplines (typically electrical engineering, mechanical engineering, or computer science) join the project.

Compared to most commercial satellite projects, FalconSAT has a considerably lower budget, and follows a very accelerated development cycle. Because of the near total personnel turnover every year (the program is generally a senior cadet project, and graduating cadets must be replaced yearly) it forces the cadet engineers to very quickly learn and become familiar with the satellite systems to which they are assigned.

FalconSAT used to have a sister project, FalconLaunch, to design and develop sounding rocket class vehicles.

== Satellites ==
- FalconGOLD (COSPAR 1997-065B) – was launched on 25 October 1997 on an Atlas rocket. Tested and proved the feasibility of using GPS to determine orbit position when outside the extent of the GPS constellation. Various web pages document FalconGOLD telemetry, a USAF Academy award, and an AIAA award. The design and launch team is documented on the AIAA award plaque. GPSWorld.com's October 1999 article declared "The results of this low-cost, off-the-shelf experiment were quite encouraging for the use of GPS at high altitudes". This work accelerated enthusiasm for GPS side lobe exploitation. The mission operated from 3 to 9 November 1997, after which the batteries of the device were depleted and the device along with the rocket upper stage to which it was solidly bolted on became derelict objects in orbit.
- FalconSAT-1 (FS 1, COSPAR 2000-004D) – was launched on 27 January 2000 on a converted Minuteman II missile (that is, Minotaur 1 rocket). It carried the CHAWS (Charging Hazards and Wake Studies) experiment developed by the Physics Department at the Academy. The satellite was successfully placed into orbit but was lost about a month later due to an electrical power system failure. No useful science data was returned, despite repeated recovery attempts. The mission was declared a loss after about a month in orbit. A USAF press statement of June 2002 said: "While FalconSat-1 was a technical failure, it was a resounding academic success".
- FalconSAT-2 (FS 2, COSPAR 2006-F01) – Significantly damaged when Falcon 1 launch vehicle failed seconds after launch on 24 March 2006. Despite the loss of the launch vehicle, the satellite landed, mostly intact in a support building for the launch vehicle. It was originally scheduled for launch on STS-114 with the Space Shuttle Atlantis in January 2003. Its payload was the MESA instrument (Miniaturized electrostatic Analyzer), which would have been used to sample plasma in the upper atmosphere. The data would have been used to correlate the effect of ionospheric plasma on trans-ionospheric radio communications.
- FalconSAT-3 (FS 3, COSPAR 2007-006E) – contains 5 experiments, including a gravity gradient boom, launch adapter shock ring, and several AFRL sponsored payloads, including MPACS (Micro Propulsion Attitude Control System), FLAPS (Flat Plasma Spectrometer), and PLANE (Plasma Local Anomalous Noise Experiment). The launch, aboard an Atlas V 401 from SLC-41 at Cape Canaveral Air Force Station, was scheduled to occur on 8 December 2006, however as this was on the same day as the scheduled launch of STS-116, and a 48-hour turnaround was required, it was delayed. Launch took place on 9 March 2007 at 03:10 UTC, alongside MidSTAR-1. While the FalconSAT-3 software architecture at launch did not provide rapid sampling of the satellite's sensors, all scientific mission objectives were achieved. The software was updated on-orbit, enabling testing of thrusters' effects on the other satellite subsystems. In addition to providing both a ground and space based training platform, FalconSAT-3 was used as a trainer for cadets at West Point, student officers at the Air Force Institute of Technology, and a ground station is in work at Vandenberg AFB, California to support the Air Force's Space 100 course. In late September 2017, the Air Force transferred control of FalconSAT-3 to AMSAT for use by the amateur radio service for the 5–6 years of expected life remaining. Non-amateur radio frequencies were disabled, and the satellite was used as a packet radio bulletin board and digipeater. FalconSAT-3 decayed from orbit on 21 January 2023.
- FalconSAT-5 (FS 5, USA 221, COSPAR 2010-062E) – was launched on 20 November 2010 at 01:25 UTC on board a Minotaur IV. Though the US$12,000,000 mission is listed on a NASA website, data are not being made available to the public through that portal. Instead, all satellite information and data are maintained internally at USAFA, with no public information being released regarding the status of this mission.
- FalconSAT-6 (FS 6, COSPAR 2018-099BK) – was launched on 3 December 2018 on board a Falcon 9. The satellite test various thrusters and measure the local plasma.
- Falcon Orbital Debris Experiment (Falcon ODE, also known as AFOTEC 1 (Air Force Operational Test and Evaluation Center 1), COSPAR 2019-026A) - was launched 5 May 2019 on an Electron rocket on the STP-27RD mission. which is intended to evaluate ground-based tracking of space objects.
- FalconSat-7 (FS 7, also known as Peregrine or DOTSI, COSPAR 2019-036) – was launched on 25 June 2019 aboard a Falcon Heavy. The primary objective is to demonstrate solar space telescope technology utilizing a membrane photon sieve.
- FalconSAT-8 was launched on 17 May 2020 at 13:14 UTC on board an Atlas V rocket. The spacecraft will test a novel electromagnetic propulsion system, low-weight antenna technology, a star tracker, a carbon nanotube radio frequency experiment, a commercial reaction wheel to provide attitude control in orbit. The FalconSAT-8 was deployed from the Boeing X-37B spacecraft around 28 May 2020 and is being used by cadets at the Air Force Academy in Colorado Springs, CO.
- FalconSAT-X was launched on 11 November 2023 at 18:49 UTC on board a Falcon 9 Block 5 rocket, as part of the Transporter-9 rideshare mission. The satellite will serve as a testbed to demonstrate new technologies as its predecessors, but no information has been released so far about the experiments on board.

In addition to the above, there were plans to construct FalconSAT-4 (FS 4) satellite, but the mission planned for this satellite was deemed too ambitious and funding could not be found for the satellite, leading to cancellation early on in the development. The satellite was replaced with the simpler FalconSAT-5.
