= FalconSAT-2 =

Plasma research satellite

- Mission type: Plasma research
- Operator: USAF Academy
- Mission duration: Failed to orbit

Spacecraft properties
- Manufacturer: SSTL (bus)
- Launch mass: 19.5 kilograms (43 lb)

Start of mission
- Launch date: 24 March 2006, 22:30 UTC
- Rocket: Falcon 1
- Launch site: Omelek
- Contractor: SpaceX

Orbital parameters
- Reference system: Geocentric
- Regime: Low Earth
- Perigee altitude: 400 kilometres (250 mi)
- Apogee altitude: 500 kilometres (310 mi)
- Inclination: 39 degrees
- Epoch: Planned

FalconSAT-2 (FS 2, COSPAR 2006-F01) was a satellite built by students of the United States Air Force Academy as part of the FalconSAT program. It was intended to be placed into low Earth orbit to study the effects of plasma on communications with spacecraft, yet failed to reach orbit due to a malfunction of its carrier rocket.

== History ==
The FalconSAT-2 program started in late 2000 as a follow-up to the FalconSAT-1. The spacecraft was based on a bus constructed by Surrey Satellite Technology Ltd, with the experiments being constructed at the USAF Academy. The primary instrument aboard FalconSAT-2 was the Miniaturized Electrostatic Analyzer, or MESA. It was originally scheduled to be deployed from Space Shuttle Atlantis, on mission STS-114 in early 2003, but this mission was delayed following the Columbia accident. The FalconSAT-2 was removed from the Shuttle manifest.

FalconSAT-2 was assigned as the payload for the maiden flight of the Falcon 1 rocket, which was launched from Omelek Island at 22:30 GMT on 24 March 2006. At launch, a corroded nut caused an engine fire, leading to the failure of the engine 25 seconds into the flight. The rocket fell into the Pacific Ocean close to the launch site. FalconSAT-2 was thrown clear of the rocket, and landed in a storage shed on Omelek Island, just a few feet from its own shipping container. FalconSAT-2 was recovered and its battered hulk is now on display among other artifacts in the Astronautics Laboratory at the United States Air Force Academy.

== See also ==
- C/NOFS
