= RazakSAT =

Malaysian satellite

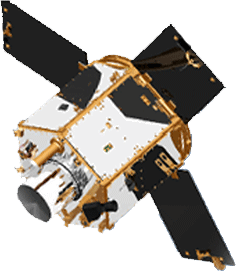
- RazakSAT
- Operator: Astronautic Technology Sdn Bhd (ATSB)
- COSPAR ID: 2009-037A
- SATCAT no.: 35578

Spacecraft properties
- Launch mass: Instruments: 50 kilograms (110 lb); Total: 180 kilograms (400 lb)
- Power: 300 watts

Start of mission
- Launch date: 14 July 2009, 03:35 UTC
- Rocket: Falcon 1
- Launch site: Omelek
- Contractor: SpaceX

End of mission
- Last contact: December 2010

Orbital parameters
- Reference system: Geocentric
- Regime: Low Earth
- Perigee altitude: 667 kilometers (414 mi)
- Apogee altitude: 691 kilometers (429 mi)
- Inclination: 8.910 degrees
- Period: 98.20 minutes
- Epoch: 25 January 2015, 03:33:28 UTC

Main camera
- Name: Medium-sized Aperture Camera (MAC)

RazakSAT was a Malaysian Earth observation satellite carrying a high-resolution camera, and the first commercial payload for SpaceX. It was launched into low Earth orbit on 14 July 2009. It was placed in a near-equatorial orbit that presents many imaging opportunities for the equatorial region. It weighs over three times as much as TiungSAT-1 and carries a high-resolution Earth observation camera. Developed in conjunction with the Satrec Initiative, the satellite's low inclination (9 degrees) brought it over Malaysia a dozen or more times per day. This was intended to provide greatly increased coverage of Malaysia compared to most other Earth observation satellites. An audit report released in October 2011 revealed that the satellite had failed after one year of operation.

RazakSAT was the only operational satellite to be put into orbit by SpaceX's Falcon 1.

== Background ==
This satellite is Malaysia's second remote sensing satellite after TiungSAT-1.

Originally called MACSAT, RazakSAT's payload is mainly electro-optical, carrying a Medium-sized Aperture Camera (MAC) which is a pushbroom camera with five linear detectors (one panchromatic, four multi-spectral) weighing approximately 50 kg. The entire satellite weighs at about 180 kg.

== Launch ==
Following three failed Falcon 1 launches by SpaceX, and an eventual successful launch in fall 2008 bearing the dummy payload RatSat, it was agreed to go forward with RazakSAT. The state-owned company Astronautic Technology Sdn Bhd (ATSB) was the only commercial contract for SpaceX until that time.

SpaceX launched RazakSAT at 03:35 UTC on 14 July 2009 using a Falcon 1 rocket. Like the previous four flights, lift-off was from Omelek Island in the Kwajalein Atoll. At 05:25 UTC Elon Musk, founder and CEO of SpaceX, told a reporter the launch had been a success. "We nailed the orbit to well within target parameters...pretty much a bullseye." Musk said.

== Operations ==
RazakSAT's mission plan was carried out by engineers from Astronautic Technology Sdn Bhd (ATSB). This was especially important because Malaysia is usually covered by the equatorial cloud bands. Normal Sun-synchronous optical satellites, which may revisit an area only once every 7 days, will almost never be able to see the ground during their pass. As a result, much optical satellite imagery of Malaysia have more than 50% cloud cover within the image's footprint.

Razaksat, on the other hand, revisited some parts of Malaysian territory every 90 minutes, potentially maximising its ability to exploit gaps in the clouds.

RazakSAT, equipped with a high resolution Medium-Sized Aperture Camera (MAC), achieved the intended Near-Equatorial Low Earth Orbit (NEqO) at 685 km altitude and a 9 degree inclination. It was expected to provide high resolution images of Malaysia that can be applied to land management, resource development and forestry.

The NEqO orbit has three distinct disadvantages. Analysis through the commercially available Satellite Tool Kit (STK) software had shown that the orbit revisit over Malaysia was found to have a maximum peak of 2-4 overpasses per day during daylight hours (from 8 am to 6:30 pm) to a period of 6 consecutive days without any usable daylight overpasses. The second disadvantage is that most imagery acquired through the NEqO orbit are not usable through a remote sensing perspective as the NEqO orbit is not a Sun-synchronous orbit, a vital criterion for monitoring and analysis work. Thirdly, it was found that the NEqO orbit exposes the satellite to the South Atlantic Anomaly (SAA) phenomenon on every orbit it takes around the Earth unlike the polar orbit, near-polar or Sun-synchronous orbits, thereby further increasing the risk of radiation damage to the satellite.

Although it was originally intended as a Research & Development (R&D) project but it was later announced for commercial purposes in 2009, the aim of the RazakSAT project was asserted as a Research & Development (R&D) Project in 2010.

During its operations after its launch in 2009, it was discovered that the RazakSAT satellite could not achieve its targeted pointing accuracy of within 1 km of its intended target. The Malaysian English newspaper The Star, quoting from the Malaysian Government Auditor-General's Report 2010, reported that the images that were acquired by the RazakSAT satellite was found to be 37 km off their intended target.

As a result of the pointing error, all of the over 1,328 images acquired by the satellite were rendered unusable. Despite a promise of delivering MAC images by 2010, as of the end of 2023, the operators have not released any images. Efforts to fix the problems with the satellite were terminated in December 2010.

== Specifications ==
The major specification of RazakSAT, as provided by the satellites' builder and operator (ATSB) in February 2010, are:

Subsystems	Specifications
Altitude	685 km
Inclination	9°
Payload (MAC)	GSD : 2.5 m (PAN), 5 m (MS); Swathwidth : 20 km @ 685 km
Attitude Determination & Control Subsystem (ADCS)	Three-axis stabilization based on four reaction wheels Pointing Accuracy : < 0.2° (2 s); Pointing Knowledge : 1 arcmin (2 s)
Electrical Power Subsystem (EPS)	GaAs/Ge solar cells on honeycomb substrate NiCd batteries (18 Ahr); Peak Power Tracking (PPT) & constant current control Solar Power : >300 W @ EOL
Command & Data Handling Subsystem (C&DH)	Two on-board computers Telemetry and command interface modules Analog Telemetry channels : up to 90; Digital Telemetry channels : up to 120
Telecommunication Subsystem (TS)	9,600 bit/s / 1,200 bit/s S-band TT&C uplink 38.4 kbs / 9,600 bit/s / 1,200 bit/s S-band TT&C downlink
Payload Data Management	32 Gbit On-board solid-state memory 30 Mbit/s X band payload data downlink
Structure & Thermal	Ø1,200 × 1,200 mm Hexagonal shape Mass : 180 kg Modular structure Passive & Active thermal control
Mission Lifetime	3 Years

=== Satellite bus ===
The satellite bus used for RazakSAT was jointly developed by ATSB and Satrec Initiative, a commercial satellite manufacturer in Korea. Satrec Initiative markets the bus system as the "SI-200".

== See also ==
- DubaiSat-1
