= FalconLaunch =

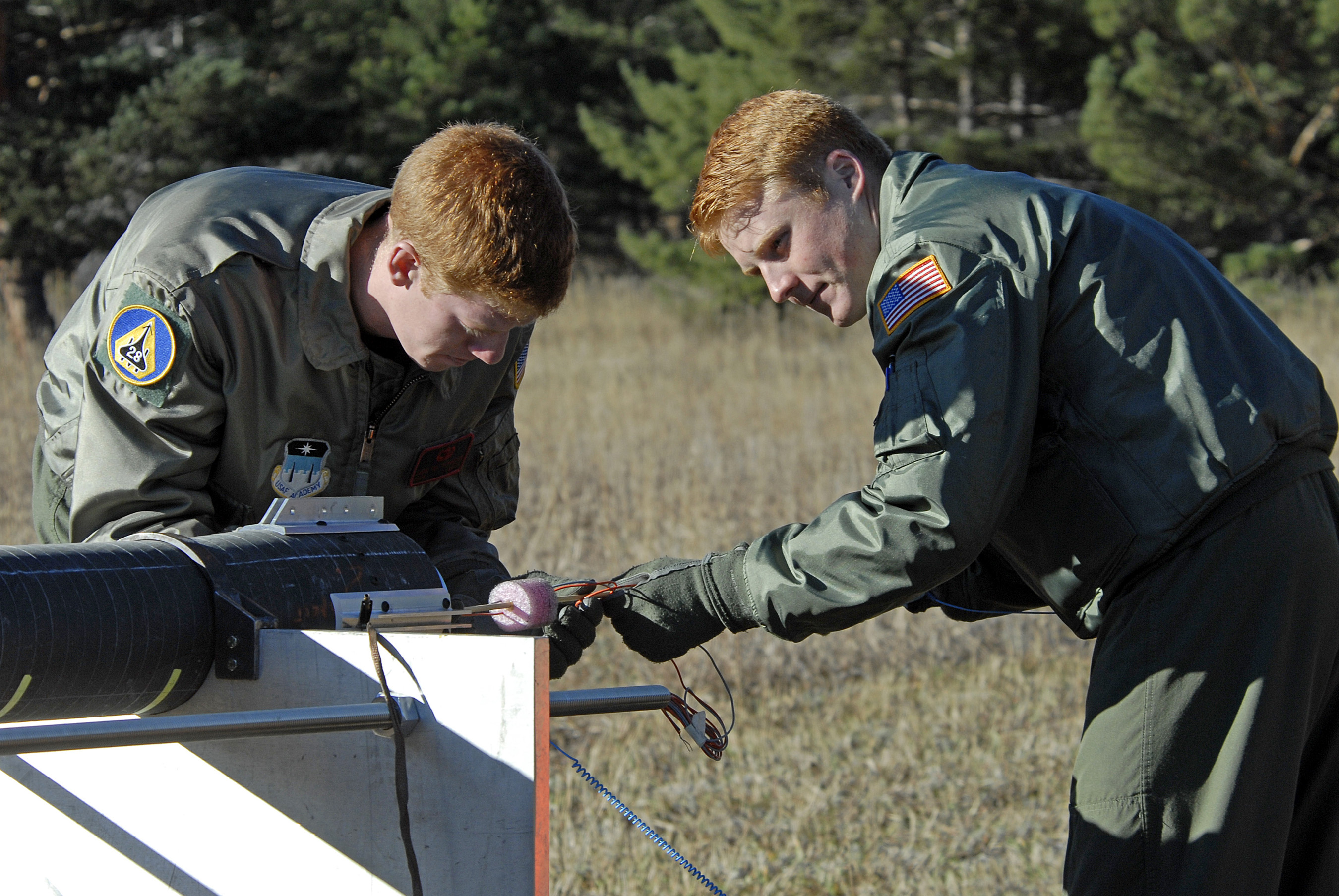
FalconLaunch 6 Preparation

FalconLaunch is the name of a former small sounding rocket development program at the United States Air Force Academy. The program falls beneath the purview of the Academy Department of Astronautics. The program has two basic purposes: first, to educate cadets in the practice of space systems engineering; and two, to produce a sounding rocket each year. The original technological goal of the program was to develop a light (~100 lb) sounding rocket capable of delivering a small (~5 lb) payload to the edge of space (~100 km). Senior-level cadets handle most aspects of the program.

This program is similar in concept to another USAFA Astronautics program, FalconSAT.

== History ==
2002-2003: FalconLaunch-1

2003-2004: FalconLaunch-2

2004-2005: FalconLaunch-3

2005-2006: FalconLaunch-4

2006-2007: FalconLaunch-5

2007-2008: FalconLaunch-6 - Exploded during test firing on 4 November 2009.

2008-2009: FalconLaunch-7 - Test launched from the White Sands Missile Range in April 2009. It successfully delivered its payload section to an altitude of 354,724 feet, setting a world altitude record for university-built rockets.

2009-2010: FalconLaunch-8 - Scheduled for test launch in April 2010.
