= Kestrel engine =

Engines named Kestrel include:

- Aircraft piston engine, built by Rolls-Royce
- Rocket engine built by SpaceX
