= Independence-X Aerospace =

Malaysian Aerospace Company

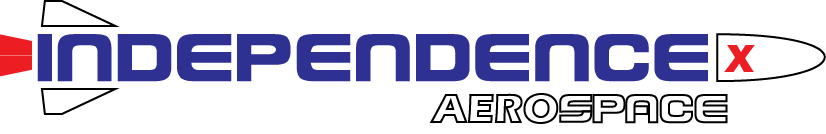
- Type: Private Limited Company
- Industry: Aerospace; Launch service provider
- Founded: 2013; 13 years ago
- Founder: Izmir Yamin
- Headquarters: Seremban, Malaysia
- Key people: Izmir Yamin (Founder, CEO, CTO)
- Products: Cryogenic rocket engine Dedicated Nano Launch Vehicle (DNLV); Microgravity Experiment Re-entry Capsule (MERCAP); Hall-effect thruster
- Website: independence-x.com

Independence-X Aerospace or better known as IDXA is a NewSpace Transportation Systems company based in Seremban, Malaysia. It provides Microgravity Experiment Re-entry Capsule Service, Launch Services, Low-Cost Satellite Development and Launch, Ground Station Service, and aims for Interplanetary Missions.

== History ==
Independence-X Aerospace or IDXA was founded in 2013 by Founder, CEO and CTO Izmir Yamin and based in Seremban, Malaysia. Back then, the initiatives was parked under a Special Interest Group experimenting with different rocket technology at engineering model and lab scale, which led to the state of the art technology on its feeding system which can reduce the entire mass of existing feeding system for liquid propellant technology by half and less the power consumption. This discovery will later help to translate into better cost effective launch price for future customers. Having the added advantage of being an equatorial launcher, it makes DNLV (Dedicated Nano Launch Vehicle) the preferred future launch for small, pico and nano class satellites.

Since 2003, three different engineering models had been designed, built and test flight which achieved remarkable success where it also won Gold Medals in Europe for its innovativeness. The rocket motor and engines are as follows: ID-1 (Solid Propellant Rocket Motor, 2003), ID-2 (Upgraded version - Solid Propellant Rocket Motor, 2005), ID-3 (Liquid Propellant Rocket Engine, 2006).

== Current development ==
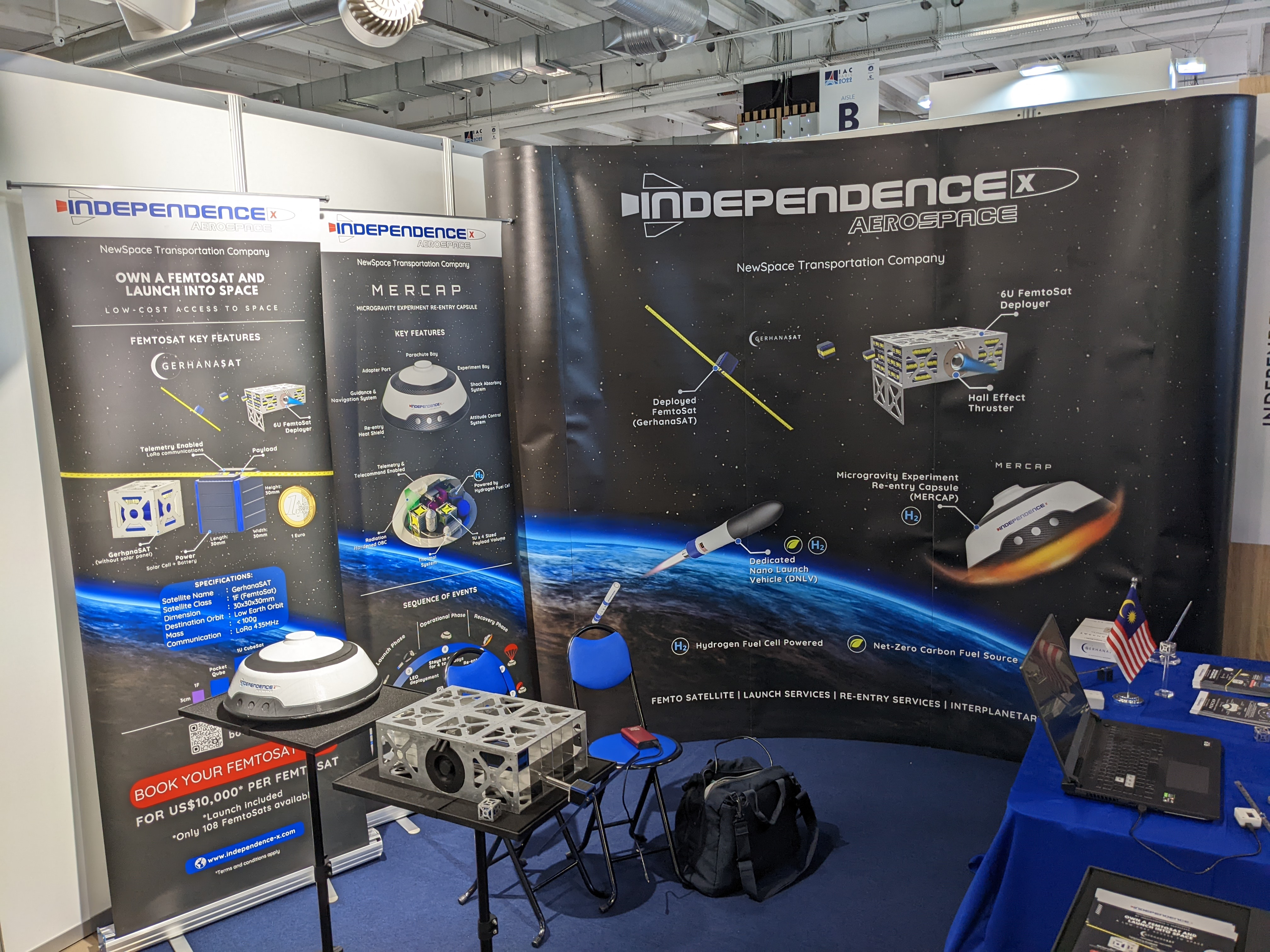
Independence-X Aerospace products featured at IAC 2022.

=== Commercial nano satellite launcher ===
IDXA would be providing future commercial rocket launch services into Low Earth Orbit (LEO). The rocket launcher is known as the Dedicated Nano Launch Vehicle (DNLV) to be commercial ready by 2025, which was featured in NASA "Small Spacecraft Technology: State of the Art" December 2015 report. The DNLV is capable of providing dedicated launch services to small satellites and cubesat owners for insertion into their intended orbit and inclination. IDXA is looking at frequent launches from near equatorial launch site for at least twice a month for the first year (24 launches / year). DNLV is capable of delivering payloads of 200 kg to a 500 km Sun-synchronous orbit (SSO).

=== Interplanetary mission ===
Interplanetary mission is currently being planned for post the year 2020, where IDXA is developing a bio-mimetic flapping winged micro aerial vehicle (B-MAV) robotic dragonfly to scout the Martian Surface to assist NASA's future Mars rover from the rough rocky Martian terrain to perform ground exploration much easily by providing avoidable obstacle path.

=== Re-entry capsule ===
IDXA is also developing a Microgravity Experiment Re-entry Capsule (MERCAP) in the pipeline for future commercial missions.

== See also ==
- Borneo SubOrbitals
- Astronautic Technology Sdn Bhd (ATSB)
