= Mynaric =

Company manufacturing laser equipment

Mynaric AG
- Formerly: Vialight Communications (2009–2017)
- Type: Subsidiary
- Industry: Aerospace, Telecommunications equipment, Networking equipment
- Founded: 2009; 17 years ago
- Founder: Dirk Giggenbach; Joachim Horwath; Markus Knapek
- Headquarters: Munich (Germany), Hawthorne, California & Washington, D.C. (United States)
- Products: Laser communication equipment for aircraft and satellites, Optical ground stations
- Parent: Rocket Lab Corporation
- Subsidiaries: Mynaric USA
- Website: mynaric.com

Mynaric AG is a manufacturer of laser communication equipment for airborne and spaceborne communication networks, so called constellations.

== History ==
In 2009, Mynaric was founded by former employees of the German Aerospace Center (DLR), and some of the key technologies have been licensed from DLR.

In November 2013, Mynaric demonstrated for the first time successful laser communication from a jet platform Tornado. A data rate of 1 Gbit/s over a distance of 60 km was achieved at a flight speed of 800 km/h. In October 2017, Mynaric performed an IPO at the Frankfurt Stock Exchange raising 27.3M € of growth capital.

In February 2018, Mynaric's laser communication products were inducted into the Space Technology Hall of Fame of the Space Foundation, and in April 2018, Mynaric announced a partnership with CEA-Leti regarding highly sensitive avalanche photodiodes that may enable longer link distances and reduced system complexity. In June 2018, Facebook's Connectivity Lab (related to Facebook Aquila) was reported to have achieved a bidirectional 10 Gbit/s air-to-ground connection with Mynaric's products.

In March 2019, Mynaric announced that former SpaceX Starlink vice president Bulent Altan joins its management board and that it has raised additional $12.5 million funding from the lead investor of an undisclosed satellite constellation.

In November 2021, Mynaric listed on Nasdaq and raised $75.9 million growth capital drawing Peter Thiel and ARK Invest as new investors. The company was also selected by Northrop Grumman as strategic supplier for laser communications and, subsequently, in June 2022, completed a ground demonstration of laser terminals that will be used to send and receive data in space as part of the U.S. National Defense Space Architecture. In July 2022, Mynaric received a strategic investment of $11.4 million from L3Harris. By June 2023, the company established itself as a dominant supplier of optical communications terminals for the Space Development Agency's Proliferated Warfighter Space Architecture, a large global satellite constellation.

In April 2026, Mynaric was acquired by the U.S. aerospace company Rocket Lab. The transaction was approved by the German Federal Ministry for Economic Affairs and Energy with conditions that ensure that intellectual property, production as well as research and development remain in Germany and Europe. In addition, access for German and European customers as well as existing export restrictions to China remain guaranteed. The company’s headquarters remains in Munich.

== Products ==
Mynaric offers various laser communication products for wireless data transmission between aircraft, UAVs, high-altitude platforms (HAPS), satellites and the ground offering Gbps-class wireless data transmission across long distances up to several thousand kilometers. The company focuses on serial production and cost reduction of its laser communication products and targets laser communication enabled airborne and spaceborne communication networks. Mynaric produces laser communication terminals with a data transfer rate of 10 Gbit/s as of early 2019.

== See also ==
- Laser communication in space
- NewSpace
- Satellite constellation
