= Space vehicle launch preparation =

The preparation of a space vehicle for launch (known by the European Space Agency (ESA) as a launch campaign), includes assembly of the launch vehicle, integration of the payload, fueling of the vehicle, and preparing the launch pad, the launch range and tracking stations. The length of time required for this process generally varies with the size and complexity of the vehicle, and the state of maturity of its development.

== Parallel campaigns ==
Arianespace, the contractor responsible for launching the Ariane 5 for the European Space Agency, can conduct two Ariane 5 ECA launch campaigns in parallel at the Guyana Space Centre.
