= PRESat =

PharmaSat Risk Evaluation Satellite

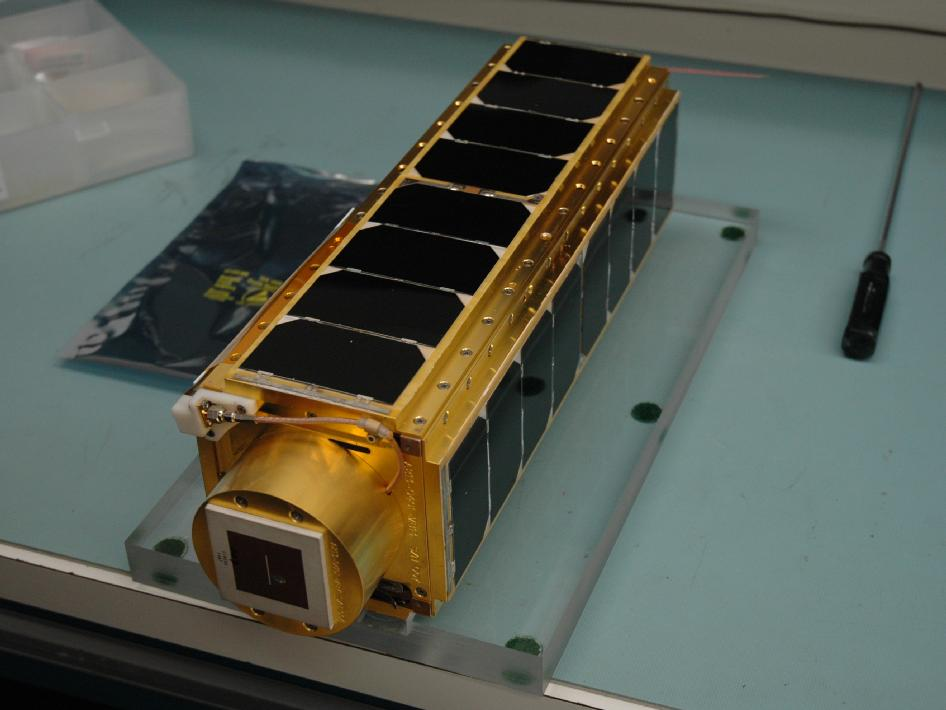
- PRESat satellite
- Mission type: Technology demonstration
- Operator: NASA
- COSPAR ID: 2008-F01
- Mission duration: Failed to orbit 60 days (planned)

Spacecraft properties
- Bus: 3U CubeSat
- Manufacturer: NASA Ames Research Center
- Launch mass: 4.5 kg (9.9 lb)
- Power: Solar cells and batteries

Start of mission
- Launch date: 3 August 2008, 03:34 UTC
- Rocket: Falcon 1 # 3
- Launch site: Kwajalein Atoll, Omelek
- Contractor: SpaceX

Orbital parameters
- Reference system: Geocentric orbit (planned)
- Regime: Low Earth orbit
- Perigee altitude: 330.0 km (205.1 mi)
- Apogee altitude: 685.0 km (425.6 mi)
- Inclination: 9°
- Period: 90.0 minutes

PharmaSat Risk Evaluation Satellite (or PRESat) nanosatellite, for NASA, was about the size of a loaf of bread, weighed about 4.5 kg (9.9 lb) and was constructed in six months.

== Spacecraft ==
The PRESat, 3U CubeSat, contained a micro-laboratory with a controlled environment packed with sensors and optical systems that could detect the growth, density and health of yeast cells. PRESat was to demonstrate its ability to create a space science laboratory using environment control techniques to monitor the levels of pressure, temperature and acceleration.

== Launch ==
The satellite was lost in the failure of the third Falcon 1 launch, on 3 August 2008, at 03:34 UTC.

== Mission ==
Although NASA was not able to test this payload in space, NASA mission managers and payload engineers achieved success in this low-cost mission by rapidly pulling together expertise from across the agency to develop, build and ground-test a fundamental space biology micro-laboratory. The communications team also successfully established a fully operational South Pacific Ground Communication System using two ground stations, which were transported and installed at Kwajalein Atoll in the Marshall Islands and at the Universidad Centroamericana in El Salvador.

== See also ==
- List of CubeSats
