= TiungSAT-1 =

Amateur radio satellite

TiungSAT-1 is the first Malaysian microsatellite. The satellite is developed through the technology transfer and training programme between Astronautic Technology Sdn Bhd (ATSB) Malaysia and Surrey Satellite Technology Ltd., United Kingdom. TiungSAT-1 was launched aboard Dnepr rocket from Baikonur Cosmodrome, Kazakhstan on 26 September 2000.

In May 2002, the amateur radio payload on the satellite was designated Malaysian OSCAR-46, or MO-46.
