= Borneo SubOrbitals =

Public-private spaceflight venture

- Company type: Public-private
- Industry: Aerospace; Launch service provider
- Founded: 2019
- Founder: The Learning Curve; Universiti Malaysia Sarawak; University of Malaya; University Teknologi Petronas; Strand Aerospace Malaysia; Hills Lifestyle Community Lifestyle Hub
- Defunct: 2022
- Headquarters: Kuching, Sarawak, Malaysia
- Key people: Fahmi Fadzil (Ambassador); Kenneth Chai (The Learning Curve's founder, project manager); Thamil Selvi Velayutham (Outreach programme member); Ramesh Subramaniam (Advisory committee member)
- Products: Hybrid-fueled suborbital rocket

Borneo SubOrbitals was a public-private spaceflight venture created in 2019. In 2022, the project was replaced by SPACE (Sarawak Physics, Astronomy & Computer Engineering) educational programme in collaboration with MEASAT Satellite Systems which allows students to launch rockets in virtual reality.

== History ==
This venture involved several tertiary institutions and a local social enterprise, which consists of Universiti Malaysia Sarawak (UNIMAS), University of Malaya (UM) and Universiti Teknologi Petronas (UTP), with the collaboration of social enterprises such as The Learning Curve, The Hills Lifestyle Community Lifestyle Hub and a company named Strand Aerospace Malaysia. Each party will be responsible for rocket research, design, assembly and launch. UTP will be handling simulations and electronics design, while UM will be handling static and dynamic structural analysis and rocket material selection and UNIMAS will manufacture and assemble the rocket, with the supervision and consultancy of Strand Aerospace Malaysia.

== Hybrid rocket suborbital project ==
The project aimed to launch a hybrid-fueled suborbital rocket from Kuching to reach an altitude of 55 km by the year 2022. The rocket will be equipped with sensors and telemetry to collect atmospheric and ocean data for researchers working at MOSTI. The rocket is then projected to land in the ocean after completing its mission. The previous rocket launch was a flight test by a teenager in Kuching that reached 5 km in altitude in October 2018. The suborbital rocket will also be gradually contributed to by students through competitions.

== See also ==
- Independence-X Aerospace
- Astronautic Technology Sdn Bhd (ATSB)
