= Astronautic Technology (Malaysia) =

Malaysian aerospace company

Astronautic Technology Sdn Bhd
- Type: Private Limited Company
- Industry: Aerospace
- Founded: 1 May 1995
- Defunct: 2019
- Headquarters: 2, Jalan Jururancang U1/21, Hicom Glenmarie Industrial Park, 40000 Shah Alam, Selangor, Malaysia
- Key people: Ahmad Sabirin Arshad (CEO until March 2019) Norhizam Ritchie Souza (Chief Technical Officer)
- Products: RazakSAT, TiungSAT-1, InnoSAT, Pipit
- Parent: Minister of Finance Incorporated
- Website: atsb.com.my

Astronautic Technology Sdn Bhd or better known as ATSB was established on 1 May 1995 and is wholly owned by the Minister of Finance Inc under the supervision of the Malaysian Ministry of Energy, Science, Technology, Environment and Climate Change (MESTECC).

As a wholly owned company under the Ministry of Finance Inc., ATSB is mandated to focus on research and development in the area of design and development of space-qualified systems employing advanced and innovative technologies.

The company ceased its operations and closed its business in 2019.

== Space projects ==
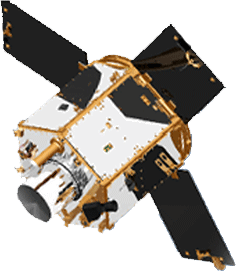
RazakSAT, one of the Malaysian satellite made by ATSB

ATSB was entrusted with the design, development, launch and operation of TiungSAT-1, Malaysia's first microsatellite that was launched aboard a Dnepr rocket from Baikonur Cosmodrome, Kazakhstan on 26 September 2000.

The technical expertise and experience gained in handling TiungSAT-1 served as a stepping stone for the second microsatellite, RazakSAT, which was successfully launched on 14 July 2009. RazakSat failed after a year, and never became fully operational.

ATSB developed the cubesat InnoSAT-2 that was launched on 29 November 2018 by ISRO. InnoSAT-2 carried a dosimeter, a CMOS camera and an experimental reaction wheel. The satellite bus was locally developed.

== Other projects ==
Differential Global Navigation Satellite System or DGNSS was developed and deployed worldwide in response to the resolution A.915(22) by the International Malaysia Marine Department Organisation. The Peninsular Malaysia Marine Department has established a network of DGNSS broadcasting stations that are supported by monitoring stations and a national control center.

== Products ==
- TiungSAT
- RazakSAT
- InnoSAT
- Pipit
- Differential Global Navigation Satellite System (DGNSS)

== See also ==
- Independence-X Aerospace
- Borneo SubOrbitals
