= Falcon 1 =

Expendable launch system by SpaceX

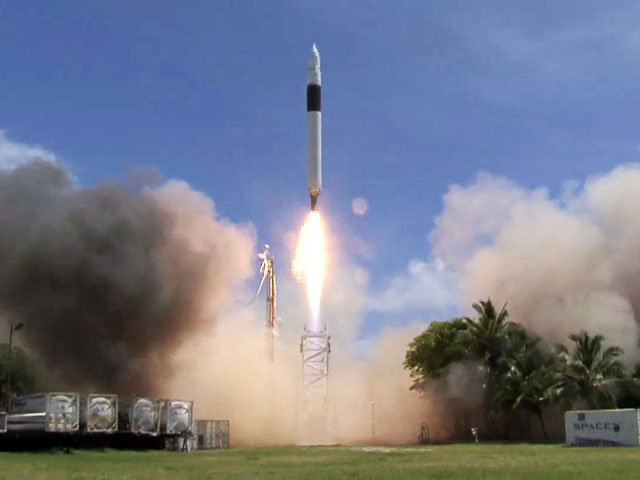
- Falcon 1 flight 4, the first successful launch of a privately developed, fully liquid-fueled rocket to enter orbit around the Earth.
- Function: Small-lift launch vehicle
- Manufacturer: SpaceX
- Country of origin: United States
- Project cost: US$90 million
- Cost per launch: US$7 million

Size
- Height: 21 m (68 ft 11 in)
- Diameter: 1.7 m (5 ft 7 in)
- Mass: 28,000 kg (62,000 lb)
- Stages: 2

Capacity

Payload to LEO
- Orbital inclination: 9.0 - 9.35°
- Mass: Demonstrated (667 km orbit): 180 kg (400 lb); Proposed (185 km orbit): 670 kg (1,480 lb)

Payload to SSO
- Mass: 200 kg (440 lb)

Associated rockets
- Derivative work: Falcon 9 v1.0

Launch history
- Status: Retired
- Launch sites: Omelek Island
- Total launches: 5
- Success(es): 2
- Failure: 3
- First flight: March 24, 2006, 22:30 UTC
- Last flight: July 14, 2009, 03:35 UTC

First stage
- Powered by: 1 × Merlin 1A (first 2 flights); 1 × Merlin 1C (final 3 flights)
- Maximum thrust: 450 kN (100,000 lb_{f})
- Specific impulse: 255 s (2.50 km/s) at sea level
- Burn time: 169 s
- Propellant: RP-1 / LOX

Second stage
- Powered by: 1 × Kestrel
- Maximum thrust: 31 kN (7,000 lb_{f})
- Specific impulse: 327 s (3.21 km/s)
- Burn time: 378 s
- Propellant: RP-1 / LOX

Falcon 1 was a two-stage small-lift launch vehicle that was operated from 2006 to 2009 by SpaceX, an American aerospace manufacturer. On September 28, 2008, Falcon 1 became the first privately developed fully liquid-fueled launch vehicle to successfully reach orbit.

The Falcon 1 used LOX/RP-1 for both stages, the first stage powered by a single pump-fed Merlin engine, and the second stage powered by SpaceX's pressure-fed Kestrel vacuum engine.

The vehicle was launched a total of five times. After three failed launch attempts, Falcon 1 achieved orbit on its fourth attempt in September 2008 with a mass simulator as a payload. On July 14, 2009, Falcon 1 made its second successful flight, delivering the Malaysian RazakSAT satellite to orbit on SpaceX's first commercial launch (fifth and final launch overall).

While SpaceX had announced an enhanced variant, the Falcon 1e, following this flight, the Falcon 1 was retired in favor of the Falcon 9 v1.0, the first version of the company's successful and long-running Falcon 9 launch vehicle.

== History ==
=== Private funding ===
The Falcon 1 rocket was developed with private funding. The only other orbital launch vehicles to be privately funded and developed were the Conestoga in 1982; and Pegasus, first launched in 1990, which uses a large aircraft as its launch platform.

The total development cost of Falcon 1 was approximately US$90 million to US$100 million.

While the development of Falcon 1 was privately funded, the first two Falcon 1 launches were purchased by the United States Department of Defense under a program that evaluates new US launch vehicles suitable for use by DARPA.

=== Cancelled launches ===
As part of a US$15 million contract, Falcon 1 was to carry the TacSat-1 in 2005. By late May 2005, SpaceX stated that Falcon 1 was ready to launch TacSat-1 from Vandenberg. But the Air Force did not want the launch of an untested rocket to occur until the final Titan IV flew from nearby SLC 4E. Subsequent and repeated delays due to Falcon 1 launch failures delayed TacSat-1's launch. After TacSat-2 was launched on an Orbital Sciences Minotaur I on December 16, 2006, the Department of Defense re-evaluated the need for launching TacSat-1. In August 2007, the Department of Defense canceled the planned launch of TacSat-1 because all of the TacSat objectives had been met.

An August 2005 update on SpaceX's website showed 6 launches planned for Falcon 1, with customers including MDA Corp (CASSIOPE, which eventually launched in 2013 on Falcon 9), Swedish Space Corp and US Air Force.

== Design ==
According to SpaceX, the Falcon 1 was designed to minimize price per launch for low-Earth-orbit satellites, increase reliability, and optimize flight environment and time to launch. It also was used to verify components and structural design concepts that would be reused in the Falcon 9. SpaceX started with the idea that the smallest useful orbital rocket was the minimum viable product (Falcon 1 with about 450 kg or 990 lb to orbit), instead of building something larger and more complicated, and then running out of money and going bankrupt.

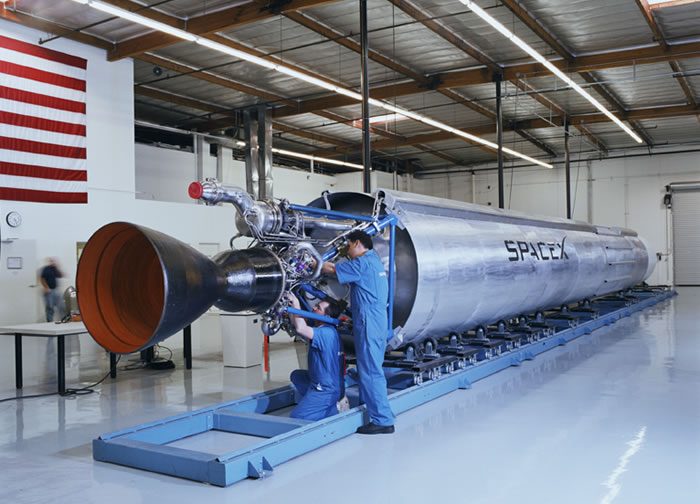
First-stage view of the Merlin engine.

=== First stage ===
The first stage was made from friction-stir-welded 2219 aluminum alloy. It employs a common bulkhead between the LOX and RP-1 tanks, as well as flight pressure stabilization. It can be transported safely without pressurization (like the heavier Delta II isogrid design) but gains additional strength when pressurized for flight (like the Atlas II, which could not be transported unpressurized). The parachute system, built by Irvin Parachute Corporation, uses a high-speed drogue chute and a main chute.

For the first two launches, the Falcon 1 used a Merlin 1A engine. An improved version of the Merlin 1A, the Merlin 1B, was supposed to fly on later flights of the Falcon 1, although it was further improved to create the Merlin 1C, which was first flown on the third Falcon 1 flight, and on the first 5 flights of the Falcon 9. The Falcon 1 first stage was powered by a single pump-fed Merlin 1C engine burning RP-1 and liquid oxygen providing 410 kilonewtons (92,000 lbf) of sea-level thrust and a specific impulse of 245 s (vacuum I_{sp} 290 s). The first stage burns to depletion, taking around 169 seconds to do so.

=== Second stage ===
The second stage Falcon 1 tanks were built with a cryogenic-compatible 2014 aluminum alloy, with the plan to move to aluminum-lithium alloy on the Falcon 1e. The helium pressurization system pumps propellant to the engine, supplies heated pressurized gas for the attitude control thrusters, and is used for zero-g propellant accumulation prior to engine restart. The Kestrel engine includes a titanium heat exchanger to pass waste heat to the helium, thereby greatly extending its work capacity. The pressure tanks are composite overwrapped pressure vessels made by Arde corporation with inconel alloy and are the same as those used in the Delta III.

The second stage was powered by a pressure-fed Kestrel engine with 31 kilonewtons (7,000 lbf) of vacuum thrust and a vacuum specific impulse of 330 s.

=== Reusability ===
The first stage was originally planned to return by parachute to a water landing and be recovered for reuse, but this capability was never demonstrated. The second stage was not designed to be reusable.

=== Launch sequence ===
At launch, the first stage engine (Merlin) is ignited and throttled to full power while the launcher is restrained and all systems are verified by the flight computer. If the systems are operating correctly, the rocket is released and clears the tower in about seven seconds. The first-stage burn lasts about 2 minutes and 49 seconds. Stage separation is accomplished with explosive bolts and a pneumatically actuated pusher system. The second stage Kestrel engine burns for about six minutes, inserting the payload into a low Earth orbit. It is capable of multiple restarts.

== Pricing ==
SpaceX quoted Falcon 1 launch prices as being the same for all customers. In 2005 Falcon 1 was advertised as costing $5.9 million ($9.5 million when adjusted for inflation in 2025). In 2006 until 2007 the quoted price of the rocket when operational was $6.7 million. In late 2009 SpaceX announced new prices for the Falcon 1 and 1e at $7 million and $8.5 million respectively, with small discounts available for multi-launch contracts, and in 2012 announced that payloads originally selected as flying on the Falcon 1 and 1e would fly as secondary payloads on the Falcon 9.

Historically, the Falcon 1 was originally planned to launch about 600 kilograms (1,300 lb) to low-Earth orbit for US$6,000,000 but later declined to approximately 420 kilograms (930 lb) as the price increased to approximately US$9,000,000. It was SpaceX's offering intended to open up the smallsat launch market to competition. The final version of the Falcon 1, the Falcon 1e, was projected to provide approximately 1,000 kg (2,200 lb) for US$11 million.

Several years ago, SpaceX was going to open up the smallsat launch market with the Falcon 1, which originally was to launch about 600 kilograms to LEO for $6 million; the payload capacity later declined to about 420 kg (930 lb) as the price increased to around $9 million. Later, the Falcon 1e was to provide approximately 1,000 kg (2,200 lb) for $11 million, but the company withdrew the vehicle from the market, citing limited demand.

== Launch sites ==
Falcon 1 first flight attempt with NASA partnership cargo at Omelek Island launchpad

All flights were launched from Kwajalein Atoll using the SpaceX launch facility on Omelek Island and range facilities of the Reagan Test Site.

Vandenberg AFB Space Launch Complex 3W was the original launch site for Falcon 1, but it was abandoned at the test-fire stage due to persistent schedule conflicts with adjacent launch pads. Cape Canaveral Air Force Station Space Launch Complex 40 (the Falcon 9 pad) was considered for Falcon 1 launches but never developed before Falcon 1 was retired.

== Variants ==
Falcon 1 Versions	Merlin A; 2006–2007	Merlin C; 2007–2009	Falcon 1e (proposed)
Stage 1	1 × Merlin 1A	1 × Merlin 1C	1 × Merlin 1C
Stage 2	1 × Kestrel	1 × Kestrel	1 × Kestrel
Height (max; m)	21.3	22.25	26.83
Diameter	1.7 (5.57743 ft)	1.7 (5.57743 ft)	1.7 (5.57743 ft)
Initial thrust (kN)	318 (71489.2 lbf)	343 (77109.5 lbf)	454 (102063
Takeoff weight (tonnes)	27.2	33.23	38.56
Fairing diameter (Inner; m)	1.5	1.5	1.71
Payload (LEO 185 km; kg)	420	470 (290 to polar)	1,010 (430 to polar)
Price (Mil. USD)	6.7	7	10.9
minimal Price/kg (LEO 185 km; USD)	~14,000	~14,000	~8400 (~20,000 to polar)
Success ratio (successful/total)	0/2	2/3	—

== Launches ==
Falcon 1 made five launches. The first three failed, however the subsequent two flights were successful, the first successful launch making it the first privately funded and developed liquid-propellant rocket to reach orbit. The fifth launch was its first commercial flight, and placed RazakSAT into low Earth orbit.

Launch attempts
Flight No.	Date / time (UTC)	Launch site	Payload	Payload mass	Orbit	Customers	Launch outcome	Launch video
1	March 24, 2006, 22:30	Omelek Island	FalconSAT-2	19.5 kg	LEO (Planned)	DARPA	Failure	(Note: Falcon 1 Flight 1 on YouTube)
1	Engine failure at T+33 seconds. Loss of vehicle. FalconSAT-2 landed on a storage shed near the launch site.							
2	March 21, 2007, 01:10	Omelek Island	DemoSat		LEO (Planned)	DARPA	Failure	(Note: Falcon 1 DemoFlight 2 Launch on YouTube)
2	Successful first-stage burn and transition to second stage, maximal altitude 289 km. Harmonic oscillation at T+5 minutes. Premature engine shutdown at T+7 min 30 s. Failed to reach orbit.							
3	August 3, 2008, 03:34	Omelek Island	Trailblazer; PRESat; NanoSail-D; Explorers	4 kg	LEO (Planned)	ORS; NASA; NASA; Celestis	Failure	(Note: Falcon 1 Flight 3 Launch Video on YouTube)
3	Residual stage-1 thrust led to collision between stage 1 and stage 2.							
4	September 28, 2008, 23:15	Omelek Island	RatSat	165 kg	LEO	SpaceX	Success	(Note: SpaceX – Falcon 1, Flight 4 on YouTube)
4	Initially scheduled for Sep 23–25, carried dummy payload – mass simulator, 165 kg (originally intended to be RazakSAT).							
5	July 14, 2009, 03:35	Omelek Island	RazakSAT	180 kg	LEO	ATSB	Success	(Note: Falcon 1 RazakSAT Mission – Highlights on YouTube)
5	Only commercial contract launch of Falcon 1.							

=== First flight ===
Launch sequence (maiden flight example);
time scale is in seconds.

The maiden flight of the Falcon 1 was postponed several times because of various technical issues with the new vehicle. Scheduling conflicts with a Titan IV launch at Vandenberg AFB also caused delays and resulted in the launch moving to the Reagan Test Site in the Kwajalein Atoll. The maiden launch was scheduled for October 31, 2005, but was held off, then rescheduled for November 25, which also did not occur. Another attempt was made on December 19, 2005, but was scrubbed when a faulty valve caused a vacuum in the first stage fuel tank, causing the walls of the tank to buckle inward, resulting in structural damage. After replacing the first stage, Falcon 1 launched Saturday, March 25, 2006, at 09:30 local time. The DARPA payload was the United States Air Force Academy's FalconSAT–2, which would have measured space plasma phenomena.

The launch took place on Saturday, March 24, 2006, at 22:30 UTC, from the SpaceX launch site on Omelek Island in the Marshall Islands. It ended in failure less than a minute into the flight because of a fuel line leak and subsequent fire. The vehicle had a noticeable rolling motion after liftoff, as shown on the launch video, rocking back and forth a bit, and then at T+26 seconds rapidly pitched over. Impact occurred at T+41 seconds onto a dead reef about 250 feet from the launch site. The FalconSAT–2 payload separated from the booster and landed on the island, with damage reports varying from slight to significant. SpaceX initially attributed the fire to an improperly tightened fuel-line nut. A later review by DARPA found that the nut was properly tightened, since its locking wire was still in place, but had failed because of corrosion from saltwater spray.

SpaceX implemented numerous changes to the rocket design and software to prevent this type of failure from recurring, including stainless steel to replace aluminum hardware and pre-liftoff computer checks that increased by a factor of thirty.

=== Second flight ===
The second test flight was originally scheduled for January 2007, but was delayed because of problems with the second stage. Before the January launch date, SpaceX had stated earlier potential launch dates, moving from September 2006 to November and December. In December the launch was rescheduled for March 9, but delayed because of range availability issues caused by a Minuteman III test flight, which would re-enter over Kwajalein. The launch attempt on March 19 was delayed 45 minutes from 23:00 GMT because of a data-relay issue, and then scrubbed 1 minute 2 seconds before launch at 23:45 because of a computer issue, whereby the safety computer incorrectly detected a transmission failure caused by a hardware delay of a few milliseconds in the process. March 20 attempt was delayed 65 minutes from an originally planned time of 23:00 because of a problem with communications between one of the NASA experiments in the payload and the TDRS system.

The first launch attempt on March 21, 2007, was aborted at 00:05 GMT at the last second before launch and after the engine had ignited. It was, however, decided that another launch should be made the same day. The rocket successfully left the launch pad at 01:10 GMT on March 21, 2007, with a DemoSat payload for DARPA and NASA. The rocket performed well during the first-stage burn. However, during staging, the interstage fairing on the top of the first stage bumped the second-stage engine bell. The bump occurred as the second-stage nozzle exited the interstage, with the first stage rotating much faster than expected (a rotation rate of about 2.5°/s vs. expected rate of 0.5°/s maximum), thereby making contact with the niobium nozzle of the second stage. Elon Musk reported that the bump did not appear to have caused damage, and that the reason why they chose a niobium skirt instead of carbon–carbon was to prevent problematic damage in the event of such incidents. Shortly after second-stage ignition, a stabilization ring detached from the engine bell as designed. At around T+4:20, a circular coning oscillation began, which increased in amplitude until video was lost. At T+5:01, the vehicle started to roll, and telemetry ended. According to Elon Musk, the second-stage engine shut down at T+7:30 because of a roll-control issue. Sloshing of propellant in the LOX tank increased oscillation. This oscillation would normally have been dampened by the Thrust Vector Control system in the second stage, but the bump to the second-stage nozzle during separation caused an overcompensation in the correction. The rocket continued to within one minute of its expected duration and also managed to deploy the satellite mass-simulator ring. While the webcast video ended prematurely, SpaceX was able to retrieve telemetry for the entire flight. The status of the first stage is unknown; it was not recovered because of problems with a nonfunctioning GPS tracking device. The rocket reached a final altitude of 289 km (180 mi) and a final velocity of 5.1 km/s, compared to 7.5 km/s needed for orbit.

SpaceX characterized the test flight as a success, having flight-proven over 95% of Falcon 1's systems. Their primary objectives for this launch were to test responsive launch procedures and gather data. The SpaceX team planned both a diagnosis and solution vetted by third-party experts, believing that the slosh issue could be corrected by adding baffles to the second-stage LOX tank and adjusting the control logic. Furthermore, the Merlin shutdown transient was to be addressed by initiating shutdown at a much lower thrust level, albeit at some risk to engine reusability. The SpaceX team wished to work on the problem to avoid a recurrence as they changed over into the operational phase for Falcon 1.

=== Third flight ===
SpaceX attempted the third Falcon 1 launch on August 3, 2008 (GMT) from Kwajalein. This flight carried the Trailblazer (Jumpstart-1) satellite for the US Air Force, the NanoSail-D and PREsat nanosatellites for NASA and a space burial payload for Celestis. The rocket did not reach orbit. However, the first stage, with the new Merlin 1C engine, performed perfectly.

When preparing for launch, an earlier launch attempt was delayed by the unexpected slow loading of helium onto the Falcon 1; thus exposing the fuel and oxidizer to the cryogenic helium, rendering the vehicle in a premature launch state. Still within the specified window, the launch attempt was recycled, but aborted half a second before lift-off because of a sensor misreading. The problem was resolved, and the launch was again recycled. With 25 minutes left in the launch window, the Falcon 1 lifted off from Omelek Island at 03:34 UTC. During the launch, small vehicle roll oscillations were visible. Stage separation occurred as planned, but because residual fuel in the new Merlin 1C engine evaporated and provided transient thrust, the first stage recontacted the second stage, preventing successful completion of the mission.

The SpaceX flight-3 mission summary indicated that flight 4 would take place as planned and that the failure of flight 3 did not make any technological upgrades necessary. A longer time between first-stage engine shutdown and stage separation was declared to be enough. The full video of the third launch attempt was made public by SpaceX a few weeks after the launch.

Musk blamed himself for the failure of this launch, as well as the two prior attempts, explaining at the 2017 International Astronautical Congress that his role as chief engineer in the early Falcon 1 launches was not by choice and almost bankrupted the company before succeeding:

And the reason that I ended up being the chief engineer or chief designer, was not because I want to, it's because I couldn't hire anyone. Nobody good would join. So I ended up being that by default. And I messed up the first three launches. The first three launches failed. Fortunately the fourth launch which was – that was the last money that we had for Falcon 1 – the fourth launch worked, or that would have been it for SpaceX.

Musk further explained the situation to Ars Technica journalist Eric Berger:

At the time I had to allocate a lot of capital to Tesla and SolarCity, so I was out of money. We had three failures under our belt. So it's pretty hard to go raise money. The recession is starting to hit. The Tesla financing round that we tried to raise that summer had failed. I got divorced. I didn't even have a house. My ex-wife had the house. So it was a shitty summer.

=== Fourth flight ===
The second-stage Kestrel engine glows red-hot during Falcon 1's fourth launch and first successful orbital flight.

Falcon 1 Flight 4
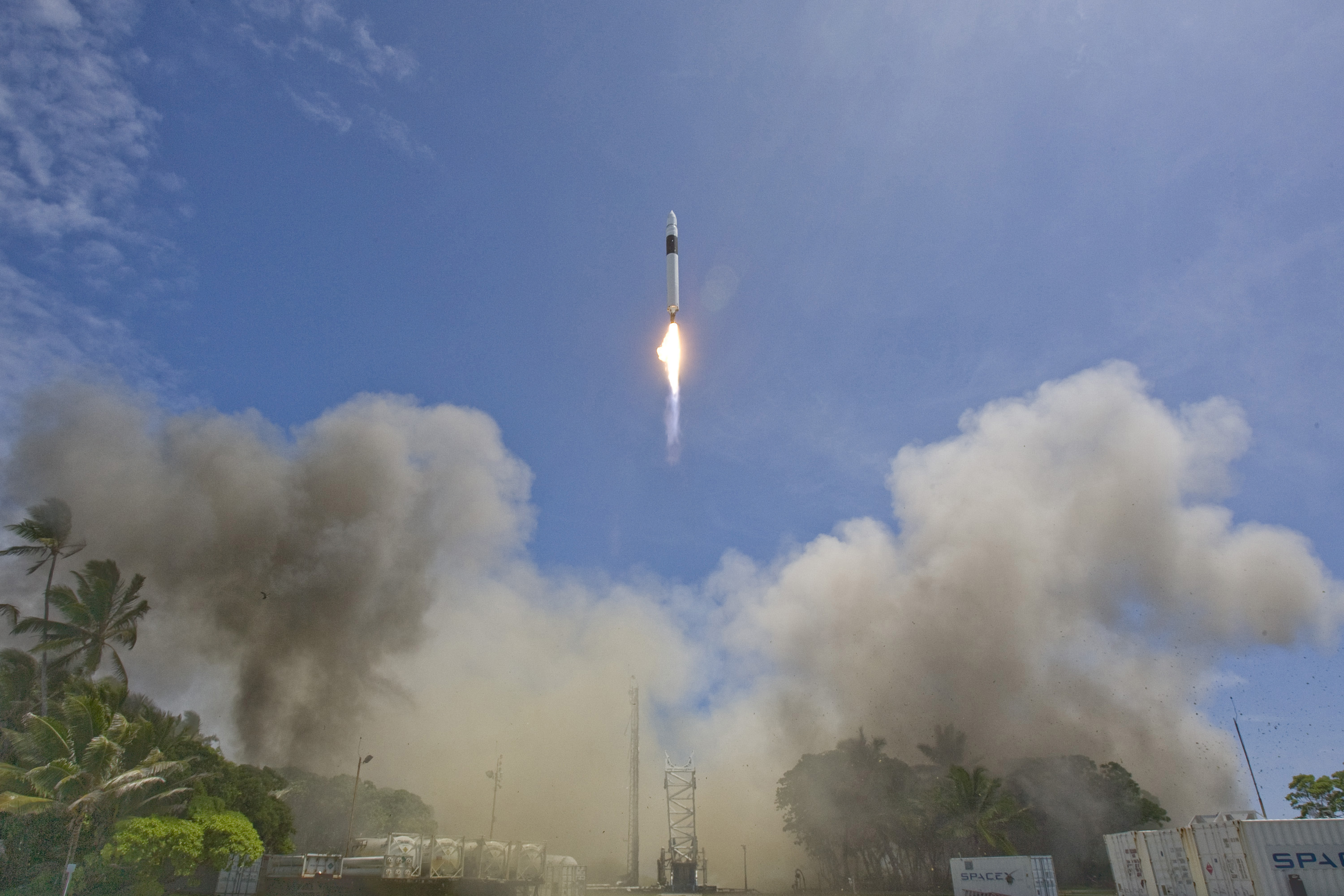
- Liftoff of Falcon 1 Flight 4
- Mission type: Payload delivery / Test flight
- Operator: SpaceX
- Launch site: Omelek Island (Kwajalein Atoll)
- Planned dates: September 23–25, 2008 (Postponed)
- Actual launch: September 28, 2008
- Launch time: 23:15 UTC
- Status: Success

Orbital details
- Target orbit: LEO (621 km × 642 km)
- Payload: RatSat (mass simulator)
- Payload mass: 165 kg (364 lb)

Mission chronology
◄ Flight 3 (Failure)	Flight 5 (RazakSAT) ►

Following the three prior failures, the SpaceX team assembled the fourth rocket using available parts in six weeks as a last chance for the company. A Boeing C-17 Globemaster III was chartered to quickly deliver the rocket, but along the way, the rocket partially imploded when repressurization exceeded what the SpaceX team had expected from the C-17's manual and the rocket had to undergo emergency repairs to be saved. Despite the challenges, the fourth flight of the Falcon 1 rocket successfully flew on September 28, 2008, delivering a 165-kilogram (363-pound) non-functional boilerplate spacecraft into low Earth orbit. It was Falcon 1's first successful launch and the first successful orbital launch of any privately funded and developed, fully liquid-propelled carrier rocket.

The launch occurred from Omelek Island, part of the Kwajalein Atoll in the Marshall Islands. Liftoff occurred at 23:15 UTC on September 28, 15 minutes into a 5-hour launch window. If the launch had been scrubbed, it could have been conducted during the same window until October 1. 9 minutes 31 seconds after launch, the second-stage engine shut down, after the vehicle reached orbit. The initial orbit was reported to be about 330 × 650 km. Following a coast period, the second stage restarted and performed a successful second burn, resulting in a final orbit of 621 × 643 km × 9.35°.

The rocket followed the same trajectory as the previous flight, which failed to place the Trailblazer, NanoSail-D, PRESat and Celestis Explorers spacecraft into orbit. No major changes were made to the rocket, other than increasing the time between first-stage burnout and second-stage separation. This minor change addressed the failure seen on the previous flight, recontact between the first and second stages, by dissipating residual thrust in the first-stage engine before separating them.

Ratsat and the attached second stage are still in orbit as of 2021.

=== Fifth flight ===
SpaceX announced that it had completed construction of the fifth Falcon 1 rocket and was transporting the vehicle to the Kwajalein Atoll launch complex where it was to be launched on April 21, 2009, which would be April 20, 2009, in the United States. Less than a week before the scheduled launch date, Malaysian news reported that unsafe vibration levels had been detected in the rocket and repairs were expected to take about six weeks. On April 20, 2009, SpaceX announced in a press release that the launch had been postponed because of a potential compatibility issue between the RazakSAT spacecraft and the Falcon 1 launch vehicle. A concern had been identified regarding the potential impact of predicted vehicle environments on the satellite. On June 1, SpaceX announced that the next launch window would open Monday, July 13 and extend through Tuesday, July 14, with a daily window to open at 21:00 UTC (09:00 local time).

The launch on July 14, 2009 (UTC) was successful, placing RazakSAT into its initial parking orbit. Thirty-eight minutes later, the rocket's second-stage engine fired again to circularize the orbit. The payload was then successfully deployed. After the launch Elon Musk, founder and CEO of SpaceX, told a reporter the launch had been a success. "We nailed the orbit to well within target parameters...pretty much a bullseye" Musk said.

The Falcon 1 upper stage was still in low Earth orbit as of 2021.

=== End of program ===
Following the fifth flight, future launches of Falcon-1 were postponed, and eventually cancelled, and the vehicle decommissioned from service, with SpaceX stating "We could not make Falcon 1 work as a business." Launches which had been booked onto Falcon-1 were moved to other vehicles or rebooked as Falcon-9 rideshare payloads.

== See also ==
- Comparison of orbital launch systems
- Comparison of orbital launchers families
- Falcon 1e
- Falcon 9
