= Omelek Island =

Island of the Republic of the Marshall Islands leased by the United States of America

Coordinates: 9°2′52.30″N 167°44′34.80″E

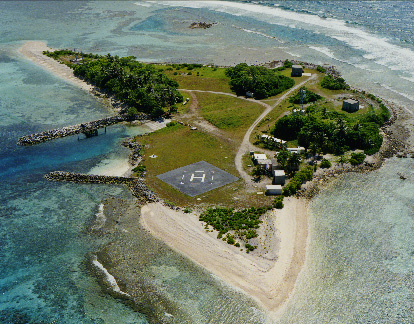
Aerial view

Omelek Island (/ˈoʊməlɛk/; Marshallese: Kom̧le, pronounced [kʷomˠ(ɤ)lʲe]) is part of the Kwajalein Atoll in the Republic of the Marshall Islands. It is controlled by the United States military under a long-term lease (along with ten other islands in the atoll) and is part of the Ronald Reagan Ballistic Missile Defense Test Site.

== Geography ==
The Island is about 32,000 m^{2} (7.9 acres) in size. Geologically, it is composed of reef-rock, as are the other islands in the atoll, which is created by the accumulation of marine organism remnants (corals, Mollusca, etc.). Sand and weeds comprise the remainder of the terrain, the loose nature of which caused issues for SpaceX employees transporting material when Omelek was used for Falcon 1 launches.

== Rocket launches ==
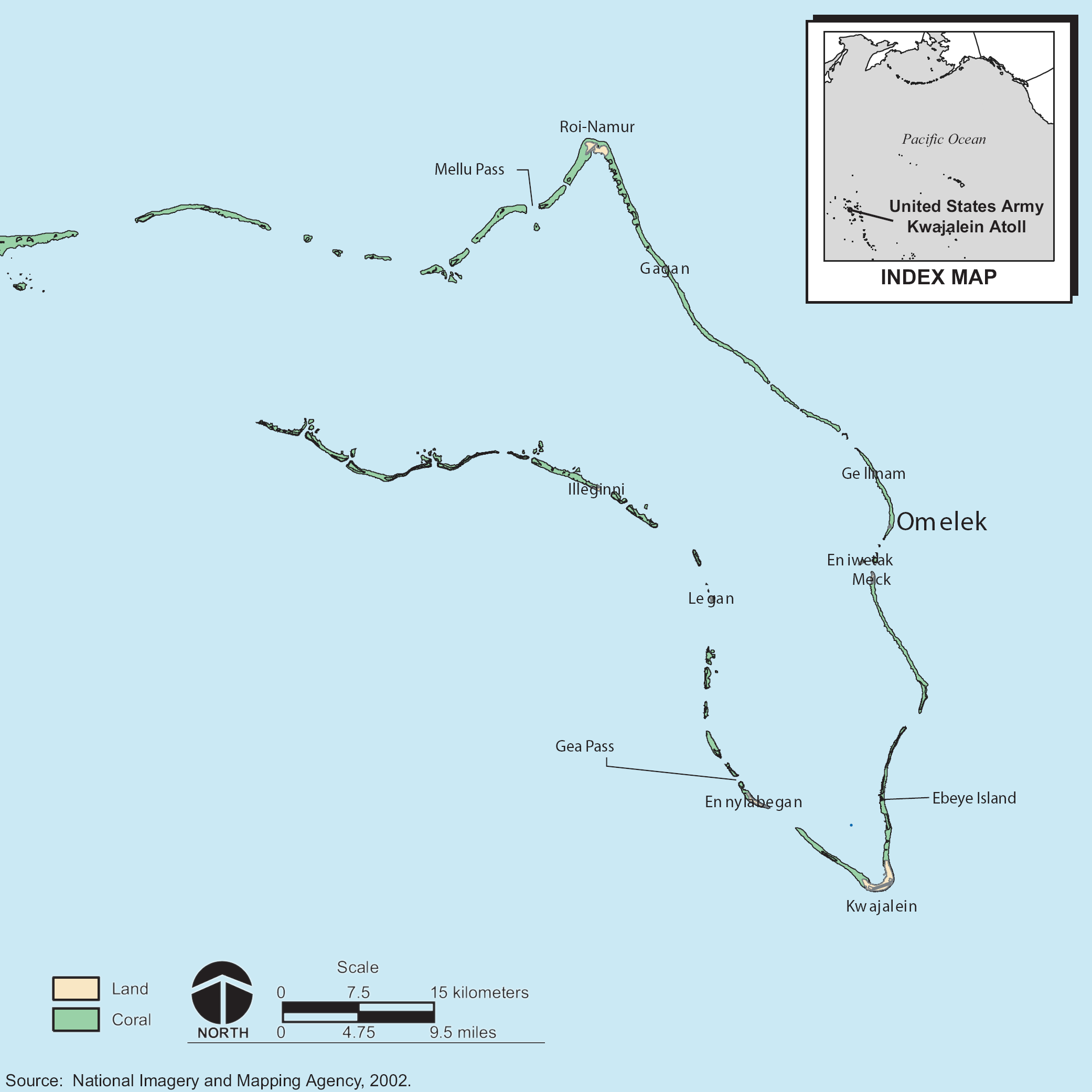
Map of Kwajalein Atoll

Omelek has long been used by the United States for small research rocket launches due to its relative isolation in the South Pacific. The last U.S. government rocket launch from the island occurred in 1996.

After 2000, the island's proximity to the equator and nearby radar tracking infrastructure attracted SpaceX, an orbital launch provider, which updated the facilities on the island and established it as their primary launch location by 2006. SpaceX began launching Falcon 1 launch vehicles from Omelek in 2006. Falcon 1 Flight 4, the first successful privately funded, liquid-propelled orbital launch vehicle, was launched from the island on 28 September 2008 and was followed by another Falcon 1 launch on 13 July 2009, placing RazakSAT into orbit. This 2009 flight was the last flight of Falcon 1, and it also marked the last flight by SpaceX from Omelek.

In total, SpaceX launched 5 Falcon 1 rockets from Omelek between 2006 and 2009, with two successes (28 September 2008, 14 July 2009) and three (24 March 2006, 21 March 2007, 3 August 2008) failures.

Omelek was planned to host launches of the upgraded Falcon 1e rocket, but in 2011-2012, SpaceX stopped development on the Falcon 1e while it focused on its large Falcon 9 launch manifest.

SpaceX had tentatively planned to upgrade the launch site for use by their larger Falcon 9 launch vehicle. As of December 2010, the SpaceX launch manifest listed Omelek (Kwajalein) as a potential site for several Falcon 9 launches, the first planned for 2012. and the Falcon 9 Overview document offered Kwajalein as a launch option. In any event, SpaceX did not make the upgrades necessary to support Falcon 9 launches from the atoll and did not launch Falcon 9 from Omelek. The site has since been abandoned by SpaceX.

Launches from Omelek were planned to resume in 2022 with space startup Astra. However, with Astra pausing launch operations and experiencing layoffs, it is unlikely that Omelek will see launches for the foreseeable future.

The Reagan Test Site, which includes rocket launch sites on other islands in the Kwajalein Atoll, on Wake Island, and at Aur Atoll, is the only U.S. government equatorial launch facility.

During the time of the Falcon 1 launches, Elon Musk visited Omelek frequently enough that he would recall to author Eric Berger that, “I remember that island like the back of my hand.”
