= List of uncrewed NASA missions =

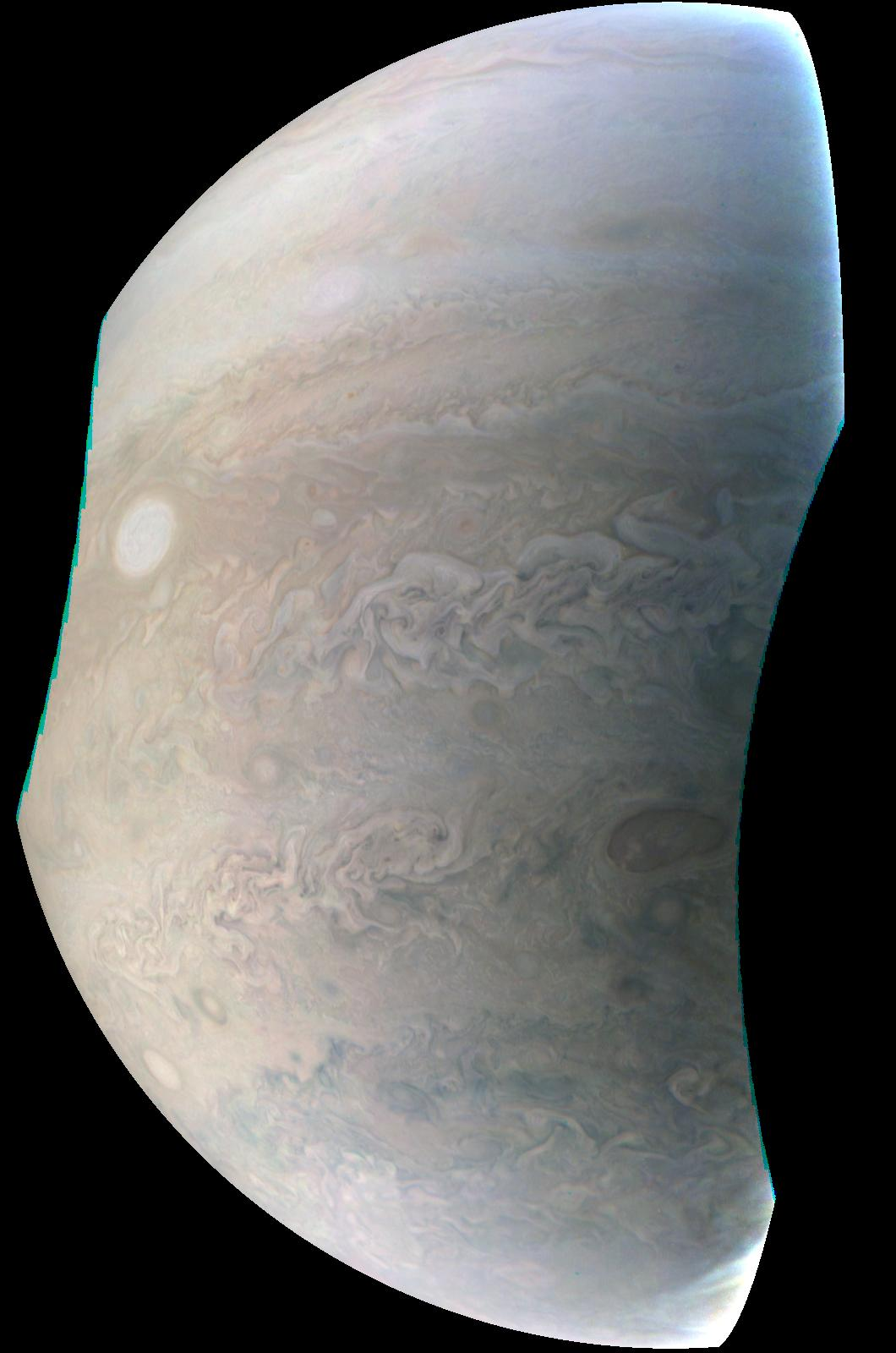
Jupiter as seen by the Juno spacecraft (2016)

The collision of comet 9P/Tempel and the Deep Impact probe (2005)

Since 1958, NASA has overseen more than 1,000 uncrewed missions into Earth orbit or beyond. It has both launched its own missions and provided funding for private-sector missions. A number of NASA missions, including the Explorers Program, Voyager program, and New Frontiers program, are ongoing.

== List of missions ==
=== Explorers Program (1958–present) ===
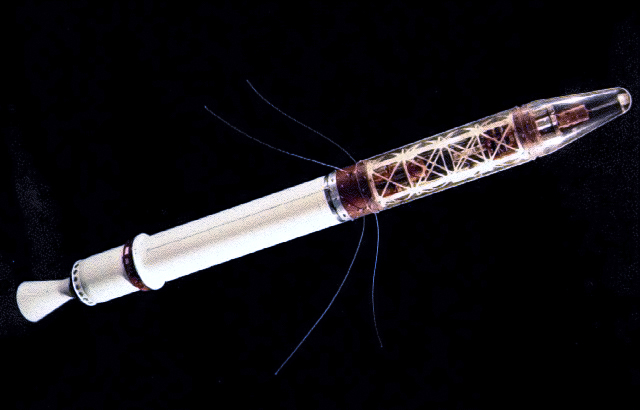
Explorer 1 satellite.

The Explorer program has launched more than 90 missions since it began more than five decades ago. It has matured into one of NASA's lower-cost mission programs.

The program started as a U.S. Army proposal to place a scientific satellite into orbit during the International Geophysical Year (1957–58). However, that proposal was rejected in favor of the U.S. Navy's Project Vanguard. The Explorer program was later reestablished to catch up with the Soviet Union after the launch of Sputnik 1 in October 1957. Explorer 1 was launched January 31, 1958; at this time the project still belonged to the Army Ballistic Missile Agency (ABMA) and the Jet Propulsion Laboratory (JPL). Besides being the first U.S. satellite, it is known for discovering the Van Allen radiation belt.

The Explorer program was later transferred to NASA, which continued to use the name for an ongoing series of relatively small space missions, typically an artificial satellite with a science focus. Over the years, NASA has launched a series of Explorer spacecraft carrying a wide variety of scientific investigations.

=== Pioneer program (1958–1978) ===
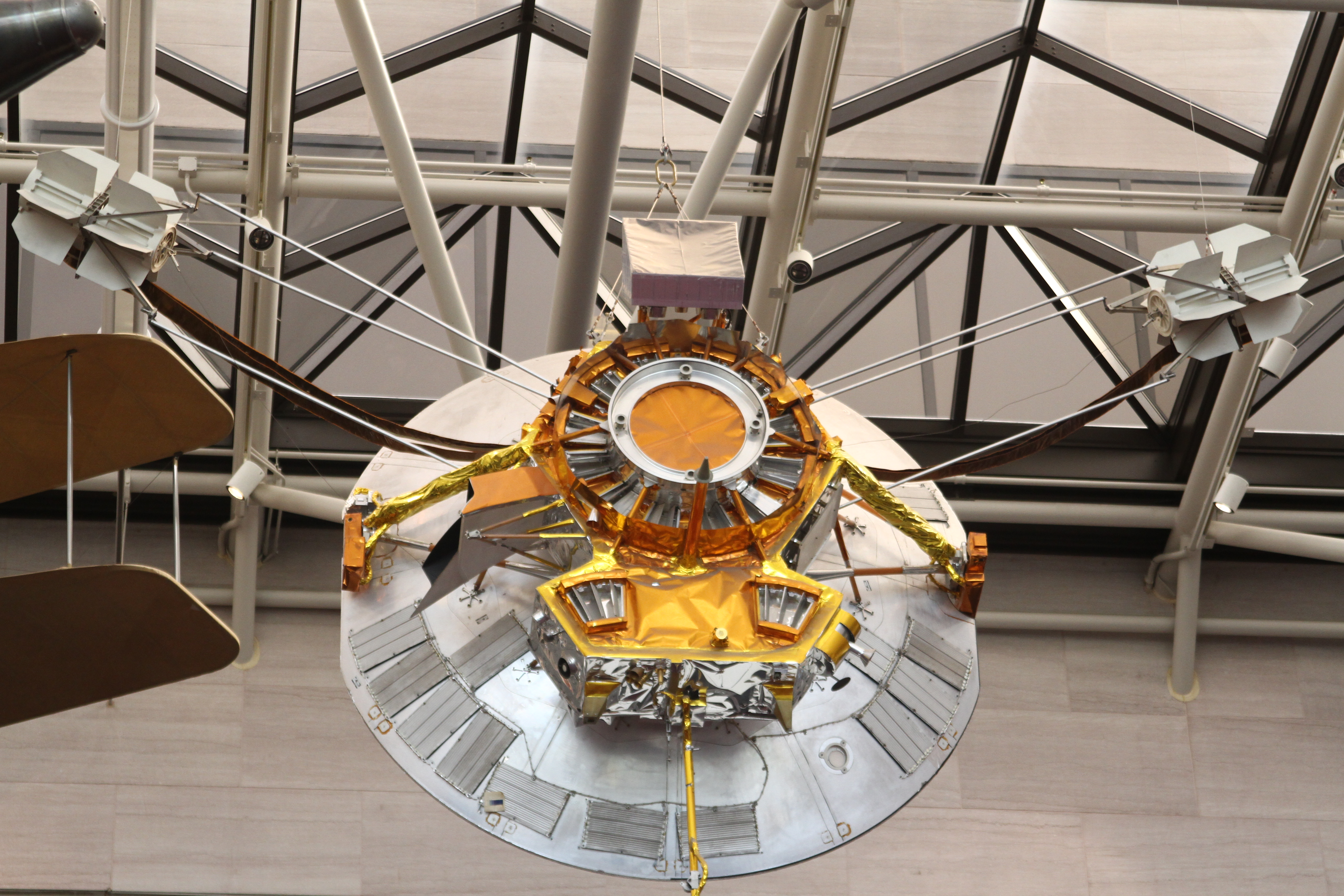
Pioneer H in the National Air and Space Museum.

The Pioneer program was a series of NASA uncrewed space missions designed for planetary exploration. There were a number of missions in the program, most notably Pioneer 10 and Pioneer 11, which explored the outer planets and left the Solar System. Both carry a golden plaque, depicting a man and a woman and information about the origin and the creators of the probes, should any extraterrestrials find them someday.

Additionally, the Pioneer mission to Venus consisted of two components, launched separately. Pioneer Venus 1 (Pioneer Venus Orbiter) was launched in May 1978 and remained in orbit until 1992. Pioneer Venus 2 (Pioneer Venus Multiprobe), launched in August 1978, sent four small probes into the Venusian atmosphere.

=== Project Echo (1960–1964) ===
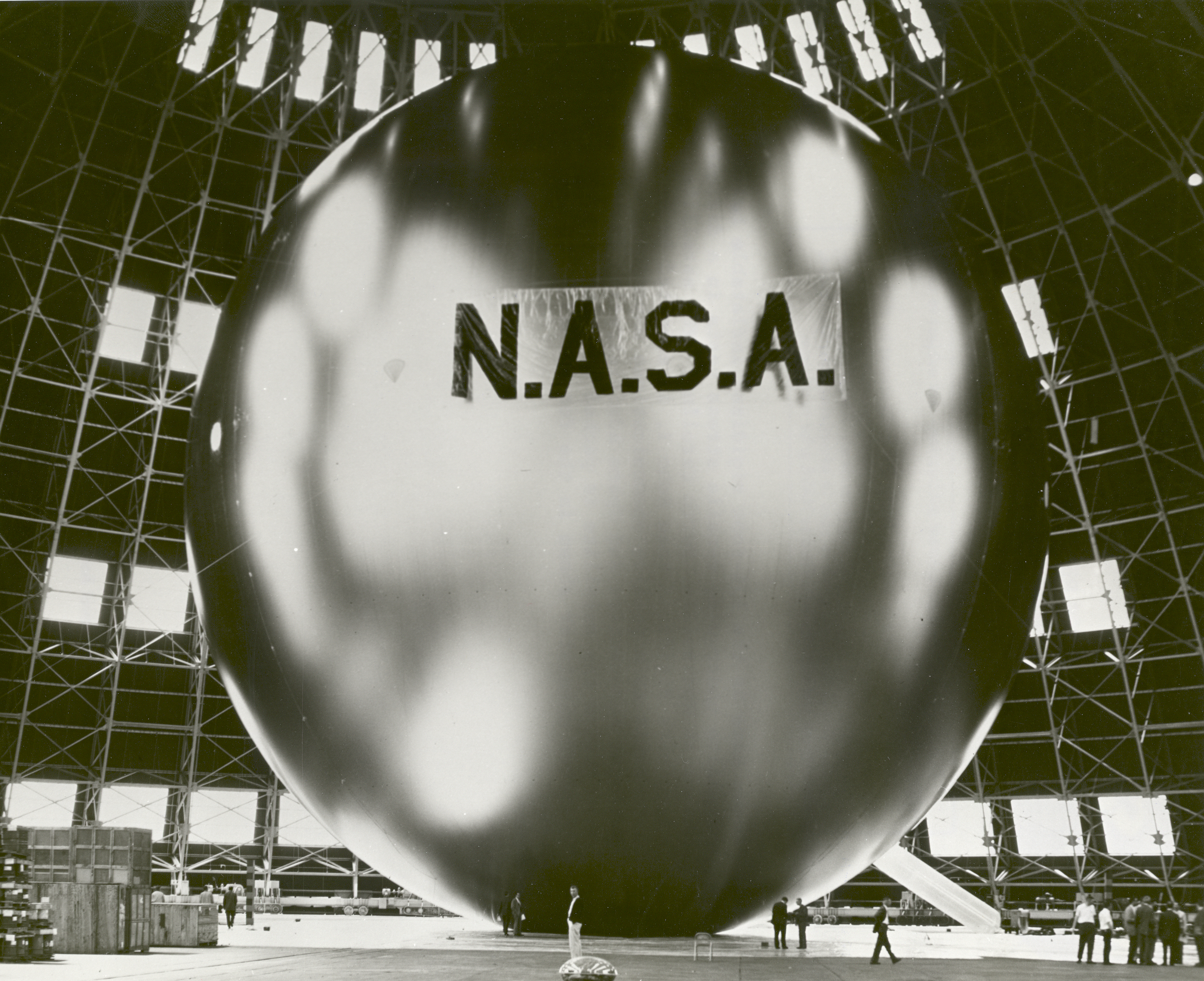
Echo 2 in a hangar, N. Carolina. People can be seen on the floor.

Project Echo was the first passive communications satellite experiment. Each spacecraft was a metalized balloon satellite to be inflated in space and acting as a passive reflector of microwave signals. Communication signals were bounced off of them from one point on Earth to another. NASA's Echo 1 satellite was built by Gilmore Schjeldahl Company in Northfield, Minnesota. Following the failure of the Delta rocket carrying Echo 1 on May 13, 1960, Echo 1A was put successfully into orbit by another Thor-Delta, and the first microwave transmission was received on August 12, 1960.

Echo 2 was a 41.1-meter (135 ft) diameter metalized PET film balloon, which was the last balloon satellite launched by Project Echo. It used an improved inflation system to improve the balloon's smoothness and sphericity. It was launched January 25, 1964, on a Thor Agena rocket.

=== Ranger program (1961–1965) ===
Ranger spacecraft

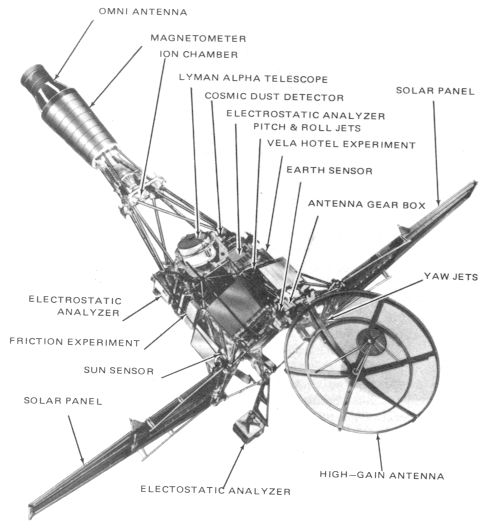
Block I.

Block II.

The Ranger program was a series of uncrewed space missions by the United States in the 1960s whose objective was to obtain the first close-up images of the surface of the Moon. The Ranger spacecraft were designed to take images of the lunar surface, returning those images until they were destroyed upon impact. A series of mishaps, however, led to the failure of the first five flights. Congress launched an investigation into "problems of management" at NASA Headquarters and JPL. After reorganizing the organization twice, Ranger 7 successfully returned images in July 1964, followed by two more successful missions.

Ranger was originally designed, beginning in 1959, in three distinct phases, called "blocks." Each block had different mission objectives and progressively more advanced system design. The JPL mission designers planned multiple launches in each block, to maximize the engineering experience and scientific value of the mission and to assure at least one successful flight. Total research, development, launch, and support costs for the Ranger series of spacecraft (Rangers 1 through 9) was approximately $170 million.

=== Telstar (1962–1963) ===
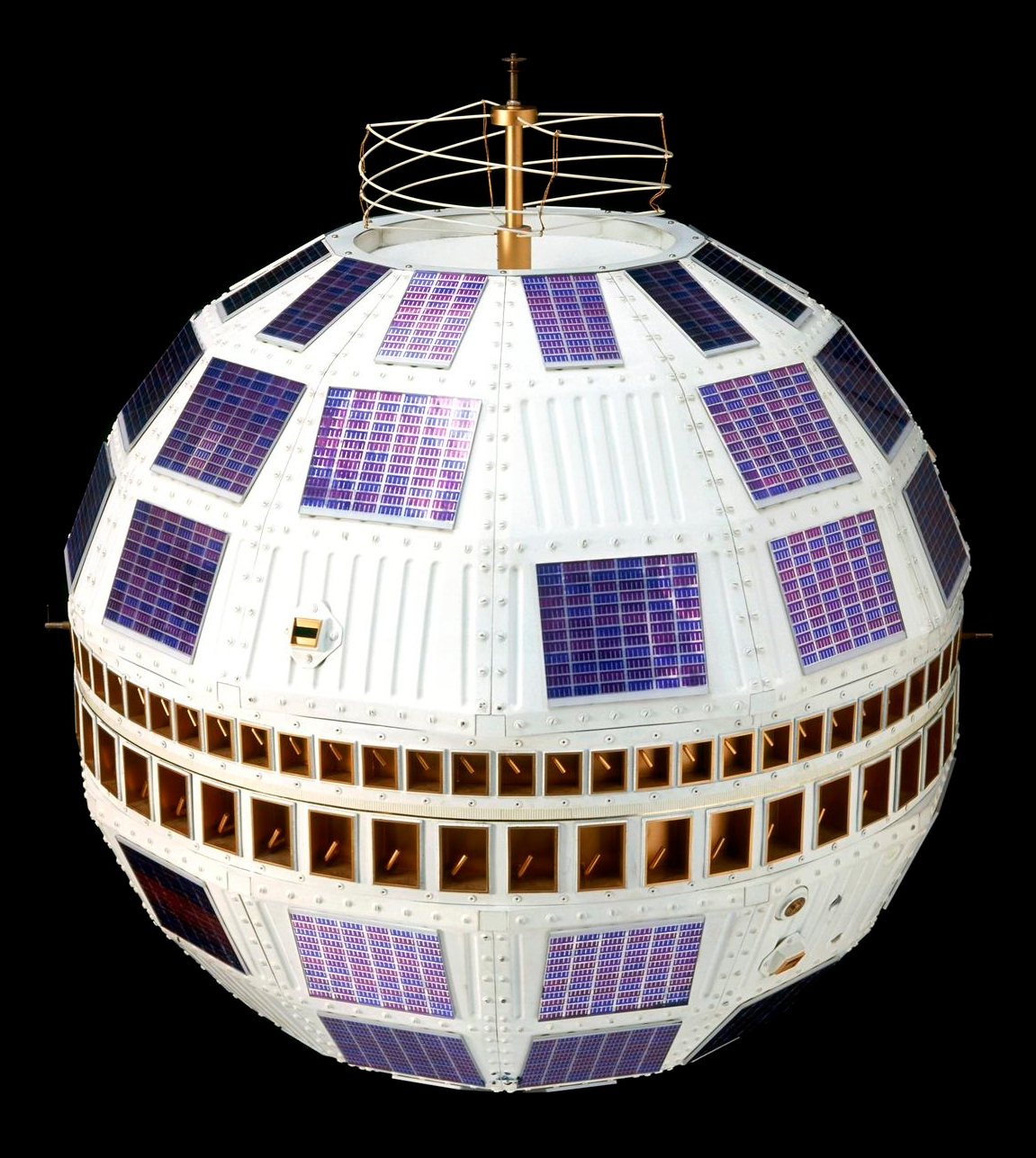
Telstar 1

Telstar was not a NASA program but rather a commercial communication satellite project. NASA's contributions to it were limited to launch services, as well as tracking and telemetry duties. The first two Telstar satellites were experimental and nearly identical. Telstar 1 was launched on top of a Thor-Delta rocket on July 10, 1962. It successfully relayed through space the first television pictures, telephone calls, and fax images, as well as providing the first live transatlantic television feed. Telstar 2 was launched May 7, 1963.

Bell Telephone Laboratories designed and built the Telstar satellites. They were prototypes intended to prove various concepts behind the large constellation of orbiting satellites. Bell Telephone Laboratories also developed much of the technology required for satellite communication, including transistors, solar cells, and traveling wave tube amplifiers. AT&T built ground stations to handle Telstar communications.

=== Mariner program (1962–1973) ===
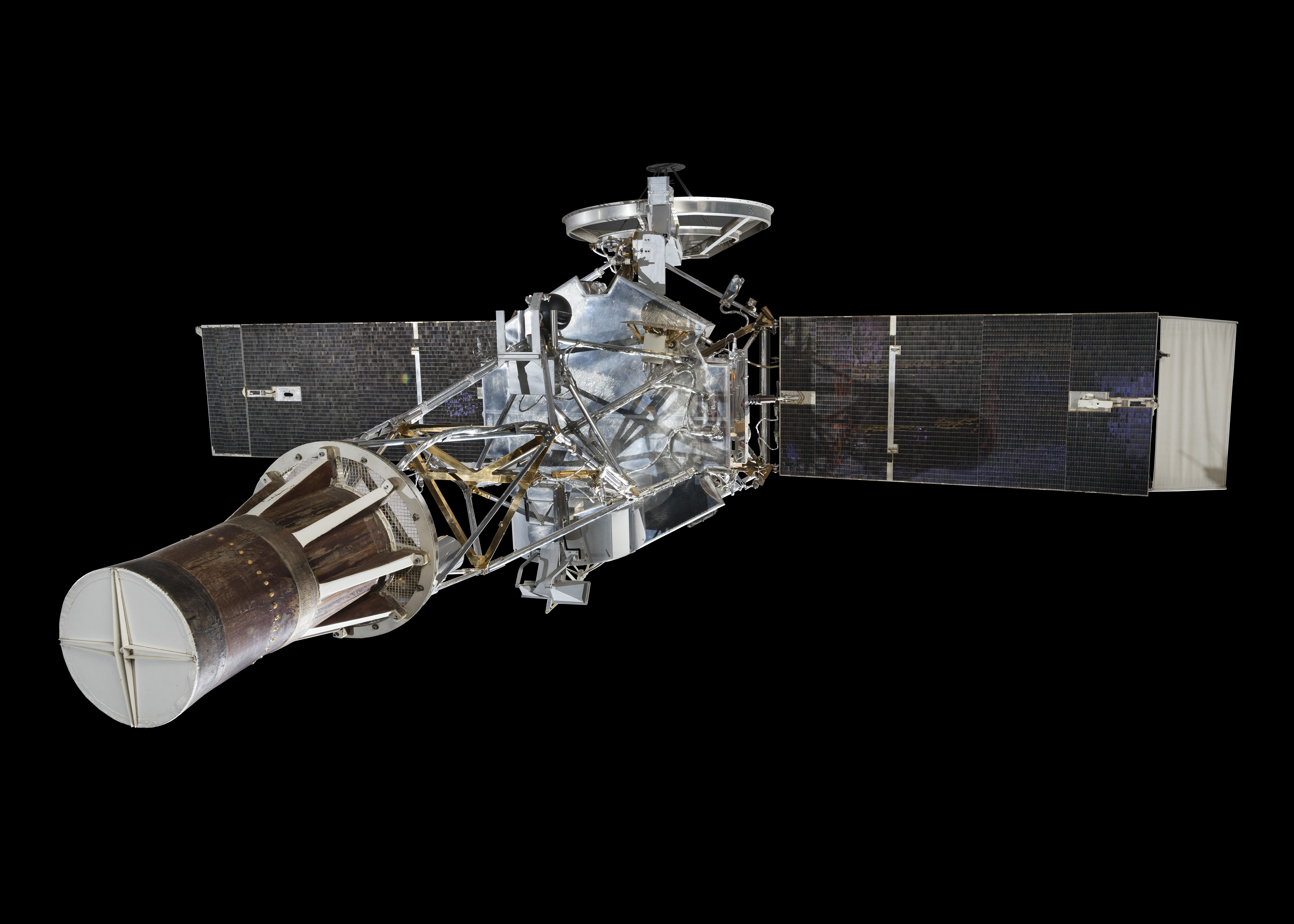
Mariner 2

The Mariner program conducted by NASA launched a series of robotic interplanetary probes designed to investigate Mars, Venus and Mercury. The program included a number of firsts, including the first planetary flyby, the first pictures from another planet, the first planetary orbiter, and the first interplanetary gravity assist maneuver, which spent more than 13 years in orbit around Saturn.

All Mariner spacecraft were based on a hexagonal or octagonal "bus", which housed all of the electronics, and to which all components were attached, such as antennae, cameras, propulsion, and power sources. All probes except Mariner 1, Mariner 2 and Mariner 5 had TV cameras. The first five Mariners were launched on Atlas-Agena rockets, while the last five used the Atlas-Centaur.

=== Lunar Orbiter program (1966–1967) ===
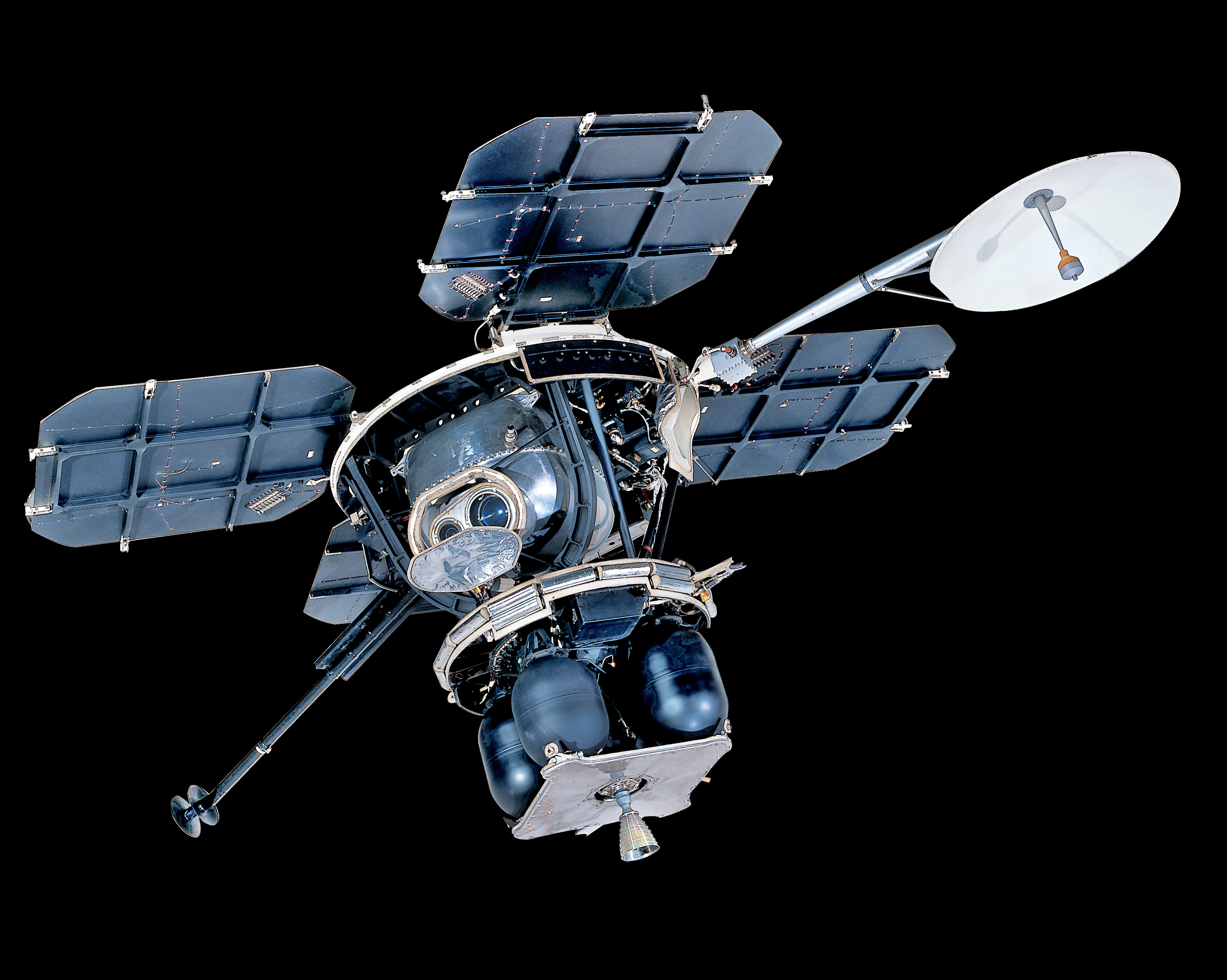
Lunar Orbiter Engineering Mock-up

The Lunar Orbiter program was a series of five uncrewed lunar orbiter missions launched by the United States, starting in 1966. It was intended to help select landing sites for the Apollo program by mapping the Moon's surface. The program produced the first photographs ever taken from lunar orbit.

All five missions were successful, and 99% of the Moon was mapped from photographs taken with a resolution of 60 meters (200 ft) or better. The first three missions were dedicated to imaging 20 potential human lunar landing sites, selected based on Earth-based observations. These were flown at low inclination orbits. The fourth and fifth missions were devoted to broader scientific objectives and were flown in high-altitude polar orbits. All Lunar Orbiter craft were launched by an Atlas-Agena D launch vehicle.

During the Lunar Orbiter missions, the first pictures of Earth as a whole were taken, beginning with Earth-rise over the lunar surface by Lunar Orbiter 1 in August 1966. The first full picture of the whole Earth was taken by Lunar Orbiter 5 on August 8, 1967. A second photo of the whole Earth was taken by Lunar Orbiter 5 on November 10, 1967.

=== Surveyor program (1966–1968) ===
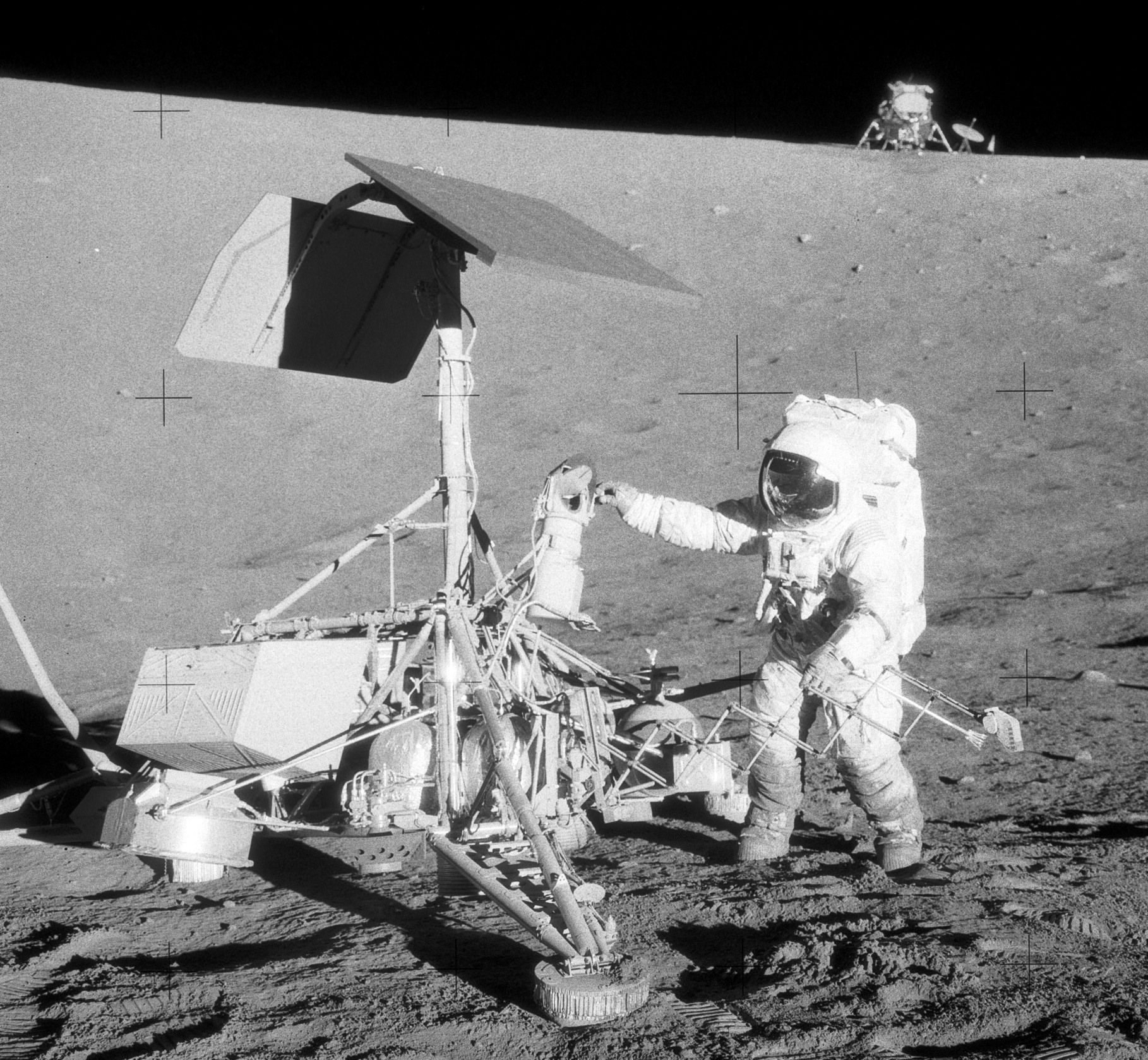
Apollo 12 astronaut Pete Conrad inspecting Surveyor 3. Lunar Module is seen in the background. 1969

The Surveyor Program was a NASA program that, from 1966 through 1968, sent seven robotic spacecraft to the surface of the Moon. Its primary goal was to demonstrate the feasibility of soft landings on the Moon. The program was implemented by NASA's Jet Propulsion Laboratory (JPL) to prepare for the Apollo program. The total cost of the Surveyor program was officially $469 million.

Five of the Surveyor craft successfully soft-landed on the Moon. Two failed: Surveyor 2 crashed at high velocity after a failed mid-course correction, and Surveyor 4 was lost for contact 2.5 minutes before its scheduled touch-down.

All seven spacecraft are still on the Moon; none of the missions included returning them to Earth. Some parts of Surveyor 3 were returned to Earth by the crew of Apollo 12, which landed near it in 1969.

=== Helios probes (1974–1976) ===
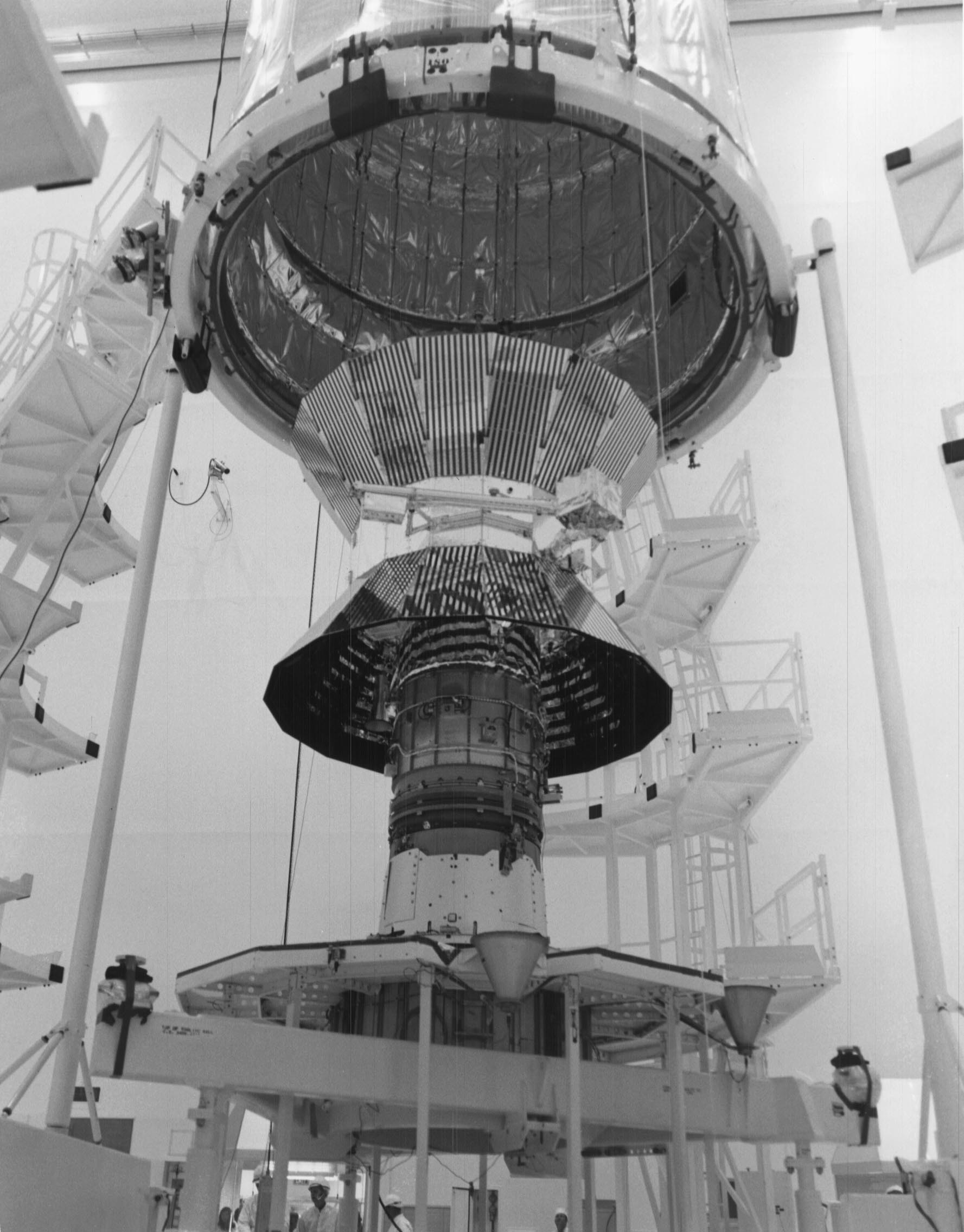
Helios probe spacecraft

Helios I and Helios II, also known as Helios-A and Helios-B, were a pair of space probes launched into heliocentric orbit for the purpose of studying solar processes. A joint venture of the Federal Republic of Germany (West Germany) and NASA, the probes were launched from Cape Canaveral Air Force Station, Florida, on December 10, 1974, and January 15, 1976, respectively. Helios 2 set a maximum speed record among spacecraft at about 247,000 kilometers per hour (153,000 mph) relative to the Sun (68.6 kilometers per second (42.6 mi/s) or 0.000229c). The Helios space probes completed their primary missions by the early 1980s, but they continued to send data up to 1985. The probes are no longer functional but still remain in their elliptical orbit around the Sun.

=== Viking program (1975) ===
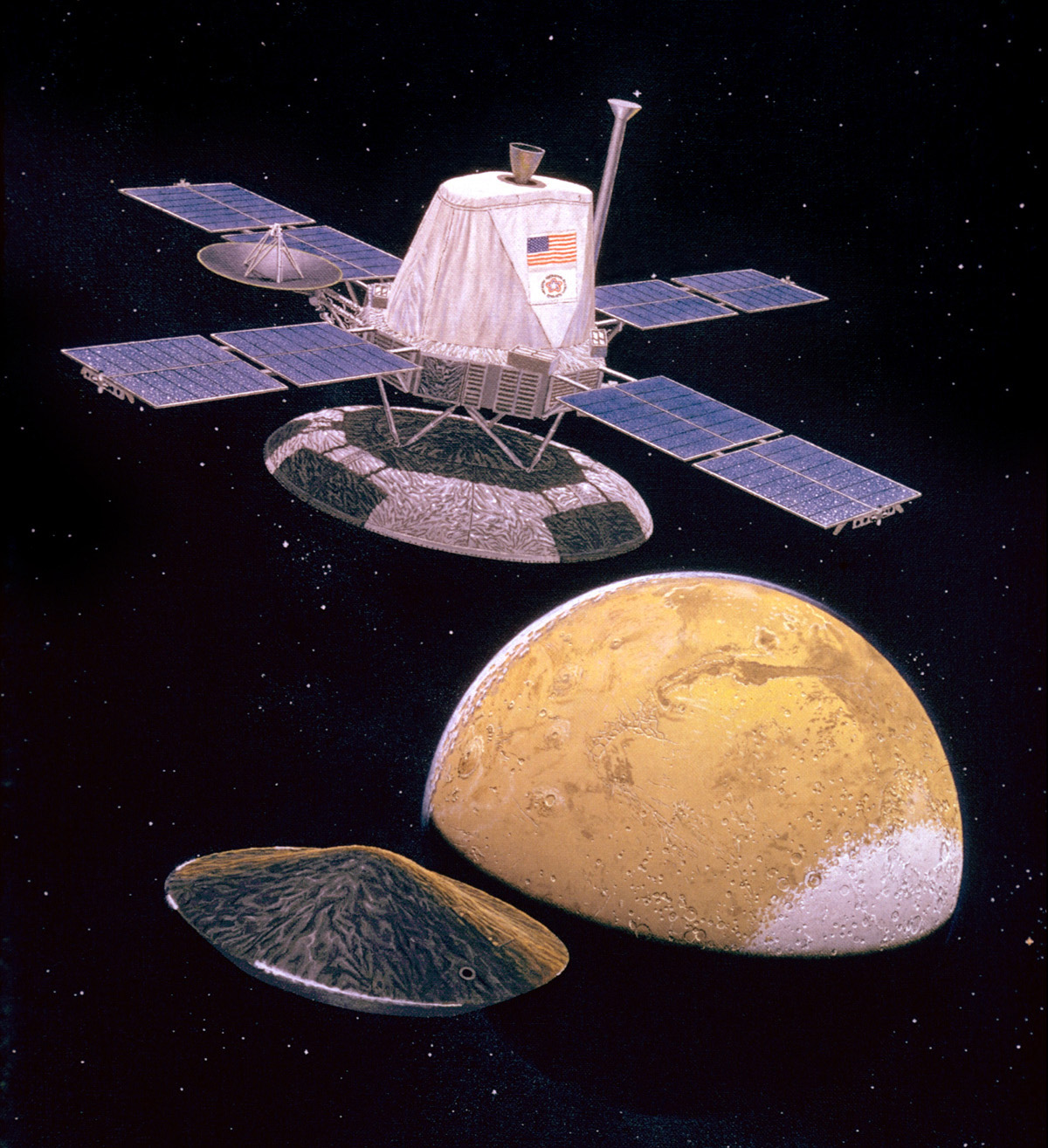
Viking at Mars releasing the descent capsule, artist concept

The Viking program consisted of a pair of American space probes sent to Mars—Viking 1 and Viking 2. Each vehicle was composed of two main parts, an orbiter designed to photograph the surface of Mars from orbit, and a lander designed to study the planet from the surface. The orbiters also served as communication relays for the landers once they touched down. Viking 1 was launched on August 20, 1975, and the second craft, Viking 2, was launched on September 9, 1975, both riding atop Titan III-E rockets with Centaur upper stages. By discovering many geological forms that are typically formed from large amounts of water, the Viking program caused a revolution in scientific ideas about water on Mars.

The primary objectives of the Viking orbiters were to transport the landers to Mars, perform reconnaissance to locate and certify landing sites, act as communications relays for the landers, and to perform their own scientific investigations. The orbiter, based on the earlier Mariner 9 spacecraft, was an octagon approximately 2.5 m (8.2 ft) across. The total launch mass was 2,328 kilograms (5,132 lb), of which 1,445 kilograms (3,186 lb) were propellant and attitude control gas.

=== Voyager program (1977–present) ===
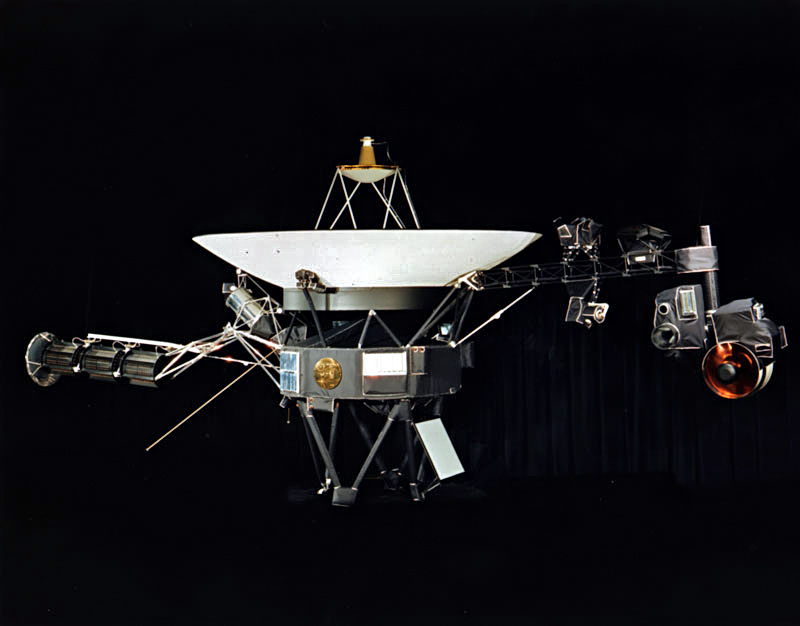
Voyager probe

The Voyager program consists of a pair of uncrewed scientific probes, Voyager 1 and Voyager 2. They were launched in 1977 to take advantage of a favorable planetary alignment of the late 1970s. Although they were originally designated to study just Jupiter and Saturn, Voyager 2 was able to continue to Uranus and Neptune. Both missions have gathered large amounts of data about the gas giants of the Solar System, of which little was previously known. Both probes have achieved escape velocity from the Solar System and will never return. Voyager 1 entered interstellar space in 2012.

As of January 19, 2019, Voyager 1 was at a distance of 145.148 AU (13.492 billion miles (21.713×10^{9} km)) from Earth, traveling away from the Sun at a speed of about 10.6 mi/s (17.1 km/s), which corresponds to a greater specific orbital energy than any other probe.

=== High Energy Astronomy Observatory 1 (1977) ===
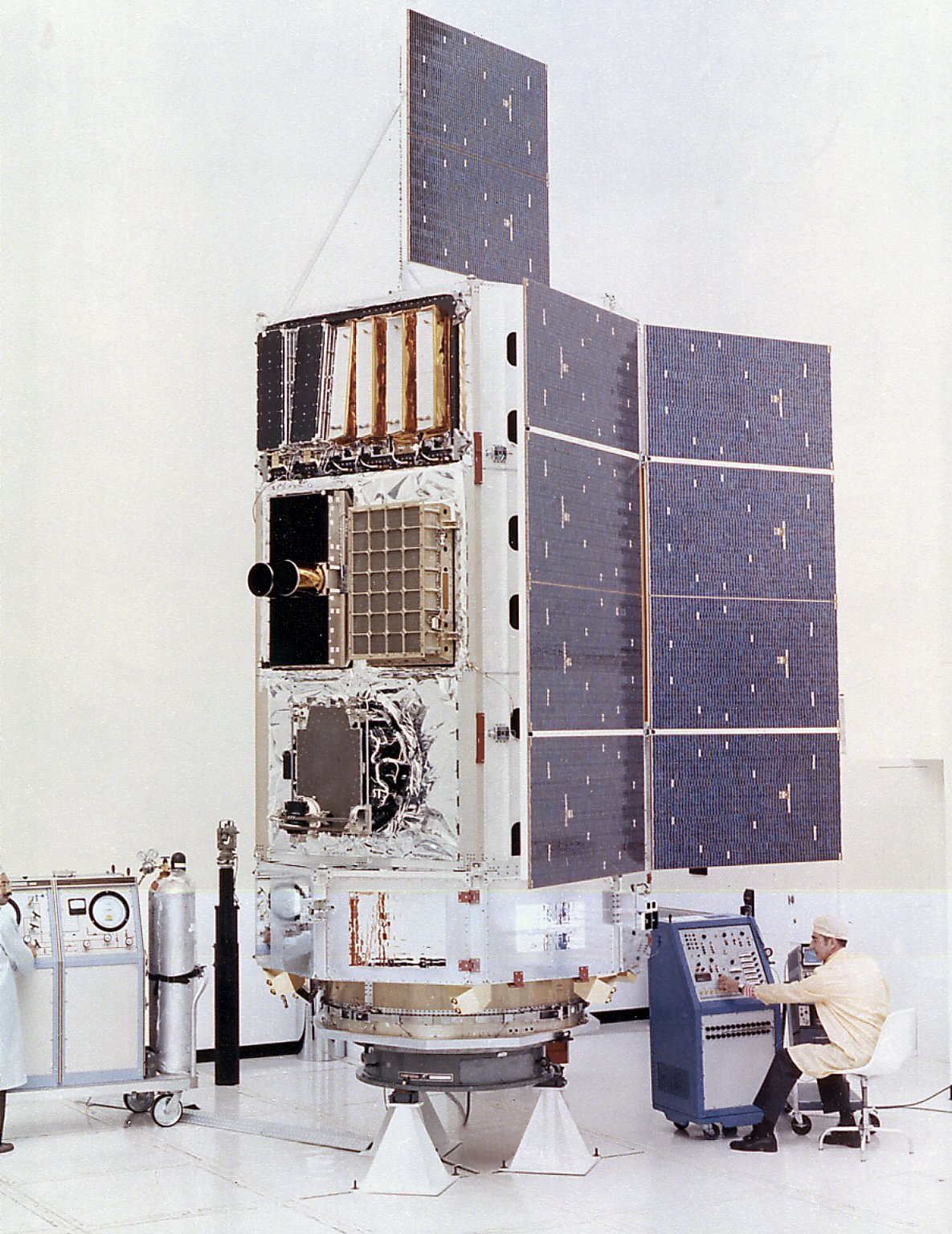
HEAO 1 Satellite

The first of NASA's three High Energy Astronomy Observatories, HEAO 1, launched August 12, 1977, aboard an Atlas rocket with a Centaur upper stage, operated until January 9, 1979. During that time, it scanned the X-ray sky almost three times over 0.2 keV – 10 MeV, provided nearly constant monitoring of X-ray sources near the ecliptic poles, as well as more detailed studies of a number of objects through pointed observations.

HEAO included four large X-ray and gamma-ray astronomy instruments, known as A1, A2, A3, and A4, respectively (before launch, HEAO 1 was known as HEAO A). The orbital inclination was about 22.7 degrees. HEAO 1 re-entered the Earth's atmosphere on March 15, 1979.

=== Solar Maximum Mission (1980) ===
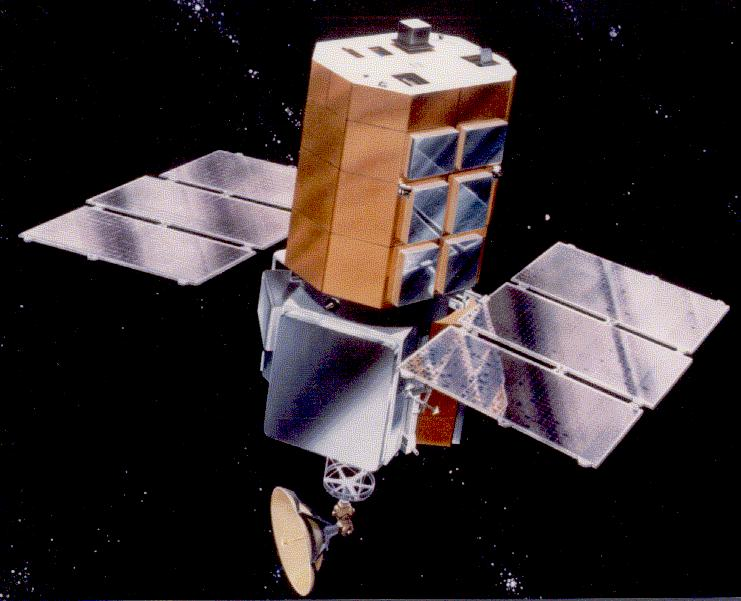
SMM satellite

The Solar Maximum Mission satellite (or SolarMax) was designed to investigate solar phenomena, particularly solar flares. It was launched on February 14, 1980.

Although not unique in this endeavor, the SMM was notable in that its useful life compared with similar spacecraft was significantly increased by the direct intervention of a human space mission. During STS-41-C in 1984, the Space Shuttle Challenger intercepted the SMM, maneuvering it into the shuttle's payload bay for maintenance and repairs. SMM had been fitted with a shuttle "grapple fixture" so that the shuttle's robot arm could grab it for repair.

The Solar Maximum Mission ended on December 2, 1989, when the spacecraft re-entered the atmosphere and burned up.

=== Infrared Astronomical Satellite (1983) ===
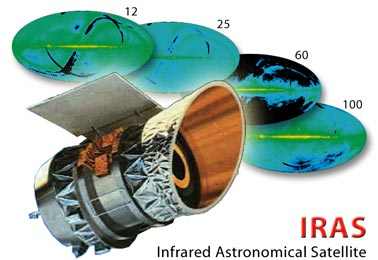
IRAS beside some of its all-sky images

The Infrared Astronomical Satellite (IRAS) was the first-ever space-based observatory to perform a survey of the entire sky at infrared wavelengths. It discovered about 350,000 sources, many of which are still awaiting identification. New discoveries included a dust disk around Vega and the first images of the Milky Way Galaxy's core.

IRAS's life, like those of most infrared satellites that followed it, was limited by its cooling system. To effectively work in the infrared domain, the telescope must be cooled to cryogenic temperatures. Superfluid helium kept IRAS at a temperature of 2 kelvins (about −271 °C) by evaporation. The supply of liquid helium was depleted on November 21, 1983, preventing further observations. The spacecraft continues to orbit close to the Earth.

The telescope was a joint project of the United States (NASA), the Netherlands (NIVR), and the United Kingdom (SERC). Over 250,000 infrared sources were observed at 12, 25, 60, and 100 micrometer wavelengths.

=== Magellan probe (1989–1994) ===
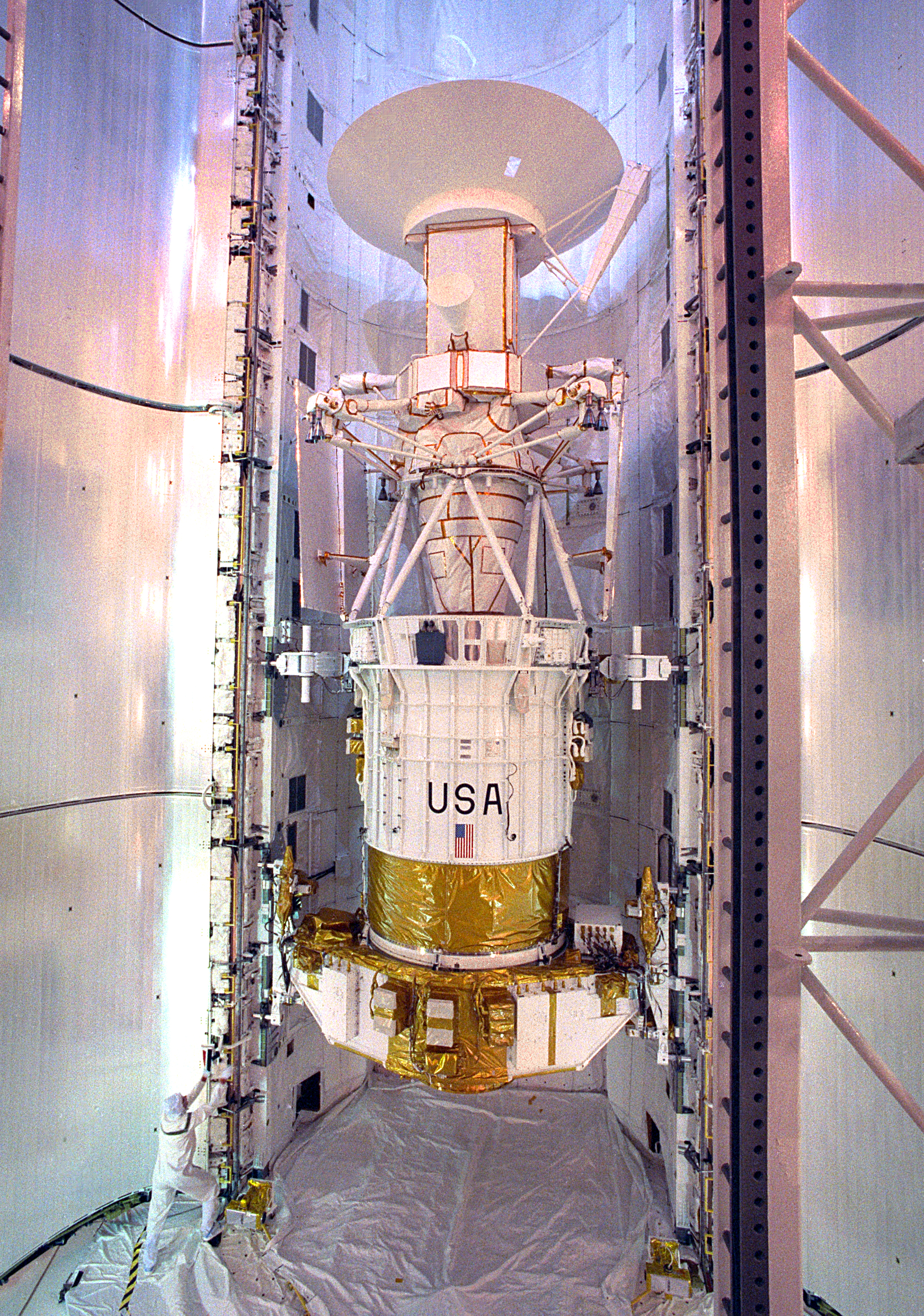
The Magellan Probe prepared for launch

The Magellan spacecraft was a space probe sent to the planet Venus, the first uncrewed interplanetary spacecraft to be launched by NASA since its successful Pioneer Orbiter, also to Venus, in 1978. It was also the first deep-space probe to be launched on the Space Shuttle. In 1993, it employed aerobraking techniques to lower its orbit. This was the first prolonged use of the technique, which had been tested by Hiten in 1991.

Magellan created the first (and currently the best) high-resolution mapping of the planet's surface features. Prior Venus missions had created low-resolution radar globes of general, continent-sized formations. Magellan, performed detailed imaging and analysis of craters, hills, ridges, and other geologic formations, to a degree comparable to the visible-light photographic mapping of other planets.

=== Galileo (1989–2003) ===
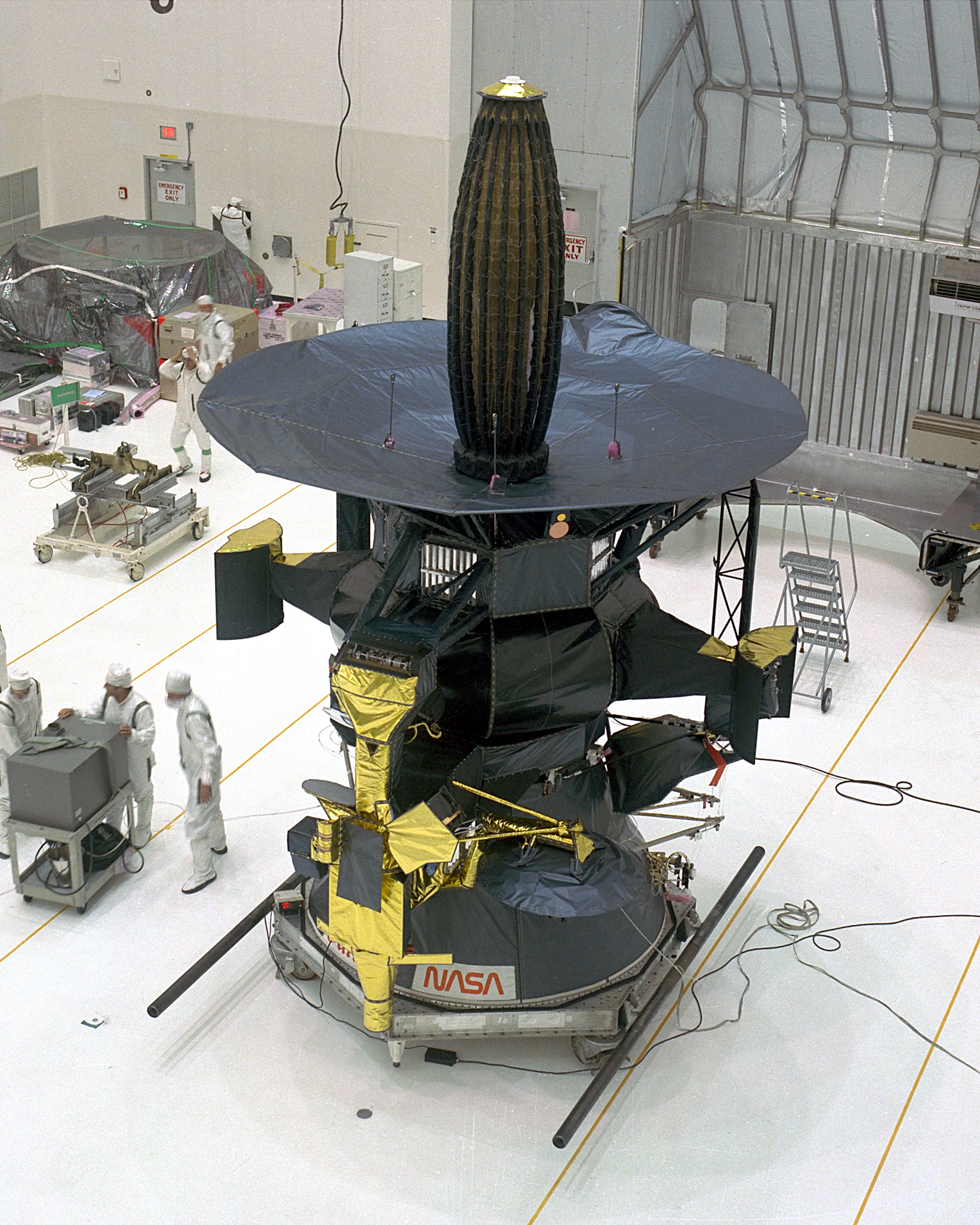
The Galileo probe

Galileo was an uncrewed spacecraft sent by NASA to study the planet Jupiter and its moons. It was launched on October 18, 1989, by the Space Shuttle Atlantis on the STS-34 mission. It arrived at Jupiter on December 7, 1995, via gravitational assist flybys of Venus and Earth.

Despite antenna problems, Galileo conducted the first asteroid flyby, discovered the first asteroid moon, was the first spacecraft to orbit Jupiter, and launched the first probe into Jupiter's atmosphere. Galileo's prime mission was a two-year study of the Jovian system. The spacecraft traveled around Jupiter in elongated ellipses, each orbit lasting about two months. The differing distances from Jupiter afforded by these orbits allowed Galileo to sample different parts of the planet's extensive magnetosphere. The orbits were designed for close up flybys of Jupiter's largest moons. Once Galileo's prime mission was concluded, an extended mission followed starting on December 7, 1997; the spacecraft made a number of close flybys of Jupiter's moons Europa and Io.

On September 21, 2003, Galileo's mission was terminated by sending the orbiter into Jupiter's atmosphere at a speed of nearly 50 kilometers per second. The spacecraft was low on propellant; another reason for its destruction was to avoid contamination of local moons, such as Europa, with bacteria from Earth.

=== Hubble Space Telescope (1990–present) ===
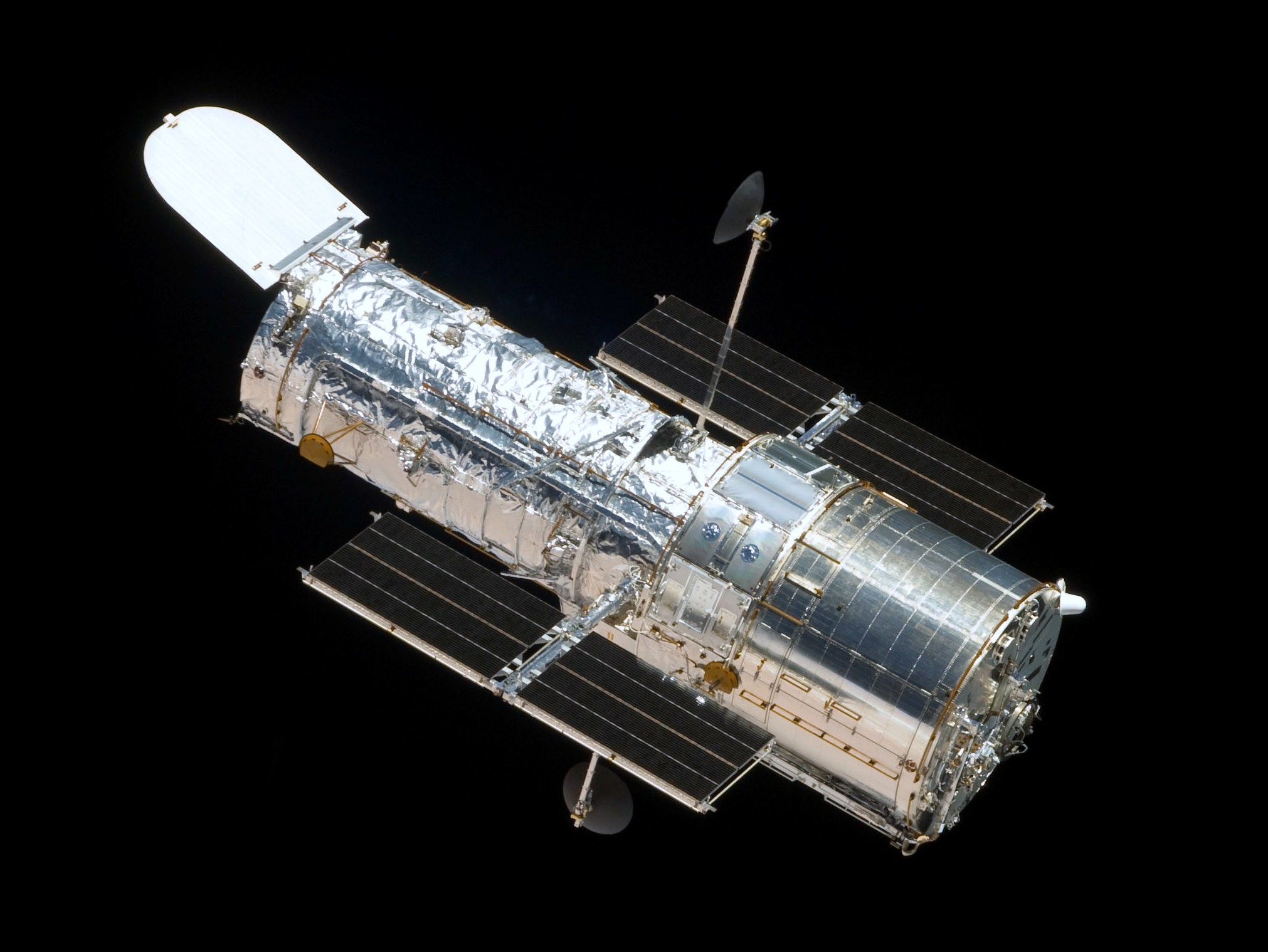
The Hubble Space Telescope

The Hubble Space Telescope (HST) is a space telescope that was carried into orbit by a Space Shuttle in April 1990. It is named after American astronomer Edwin Hubble. Although not the first space telescope, Hubble is one of the largest and most versatile, and is well known as both a vital research tool and a public relations boon for astronomy. The HST is a collaboration between NASA and the European Space Agency, and is one of NASA's Great Observatories, along with the Compton Gamma Ray Observatory, the Chandra X-ray Observatory, and the Spitzer Space Telescope. The HST's success has paved the way for greater collaboration between the agencies.

The HST was created with a budget of $2 billion and has continued operation since 1990, delighting both scientists and the public. Some of its images, such as the Hubble Deep Field, have become famous.

=== Ulysses (1990–2009) ===
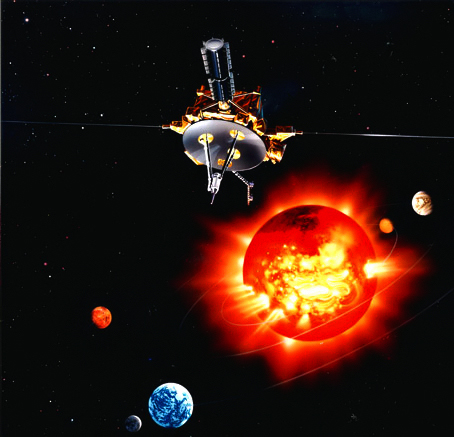
Ulysses (artist rendering)

Ulysses is a decommissioned robotic space probe that was designed to study the Sun as a joint venture of NASA and the European Space Agency (ESA). Ulysses was launched on October 6, 1990, aboard Discovery (mission STS-41). The spacecraft's mission was to study the Sun at all latitudes. This required a major orbital plane shift, which was accomplished by using an encounter with Jupiter. The need for a Jupiter encounter meant that Ulysses could not be powered by solar cells and was powered by a radioisotope thermoelectric generator (RTG) instead.

By February 2008, the power output from the RTG, which is generated by heat from radioactive decay, had decreased enough to leave insufficient power to keep the spacecraft's attitude control hydrazine fuel from freezing. Mission scientists kept the fuel liquid by conducting short thruster burns, allowing the mission to continue. The cessation of mission operations and deactivation of the spacecraft was determined by the inability to prevent attitude control fuel from freezing. The last day for mission operations on Ulysses was June 30, 2009.

=== Upper Atmosphere Research Satellite (1991) ===
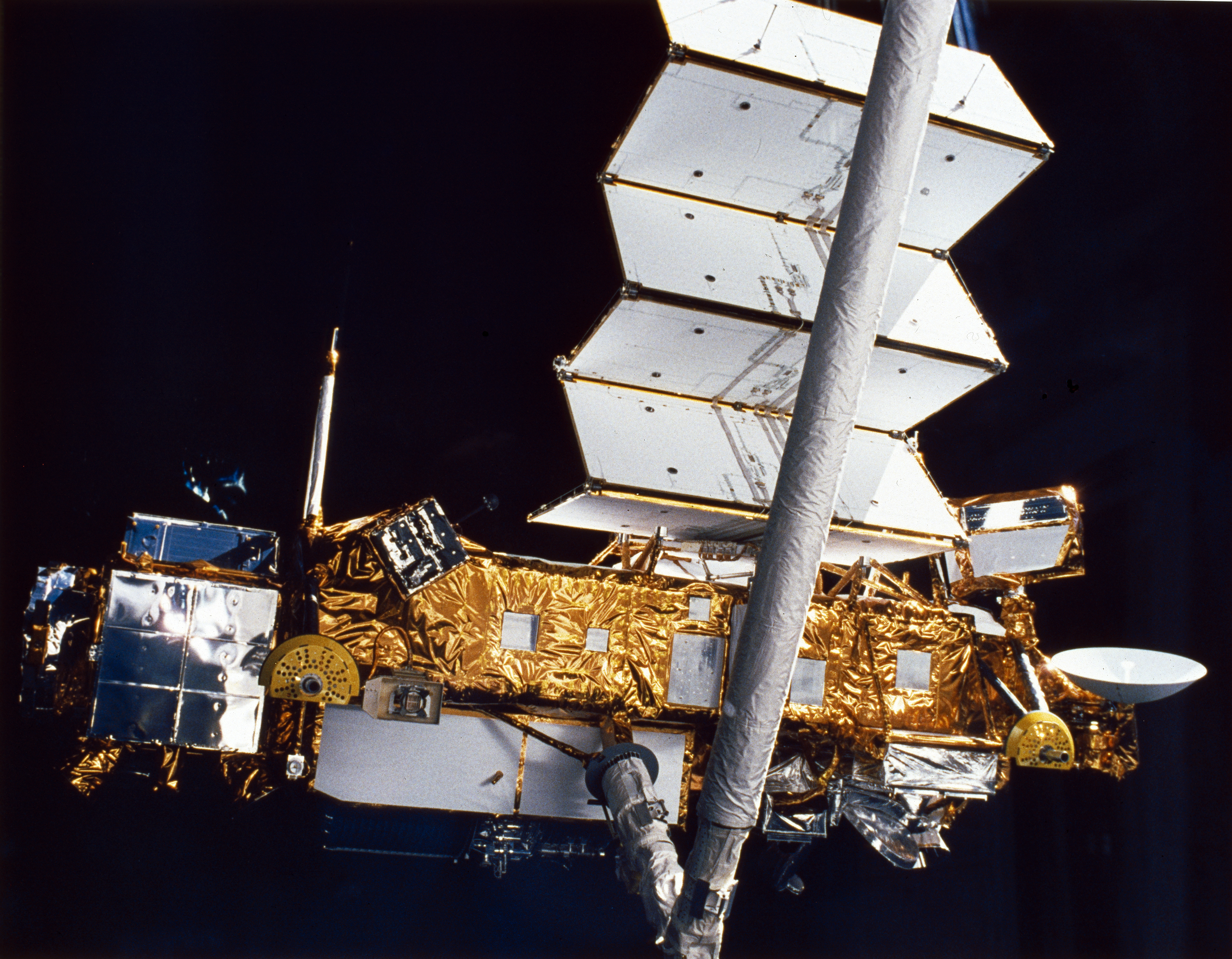
Upper Atmosphere Research Satellite (UARS) deployed

The Upper Atmosphere Research Satellite (UARS) was a science satellite used from 1991 to 2005 to study Earth's atmosphere, including the ozone layer. Planned for a three-year mission, it proved much more durable, allowing extended observation from its instrument suite. It was launched aboard Space Shuttle Discovery and deployed into space from the payload bay with its robotic arm, under guidance from the crew. The satellite underwent atmospheric re-entry at about 04:00 24 September 2011 UTC. At about 6 tonnes, it was the heaviest NASA satellite to undergo uncontrolled atmospheric entry since Skylab in the summer of 1979.

=== Discovery Program (1992–present) ===
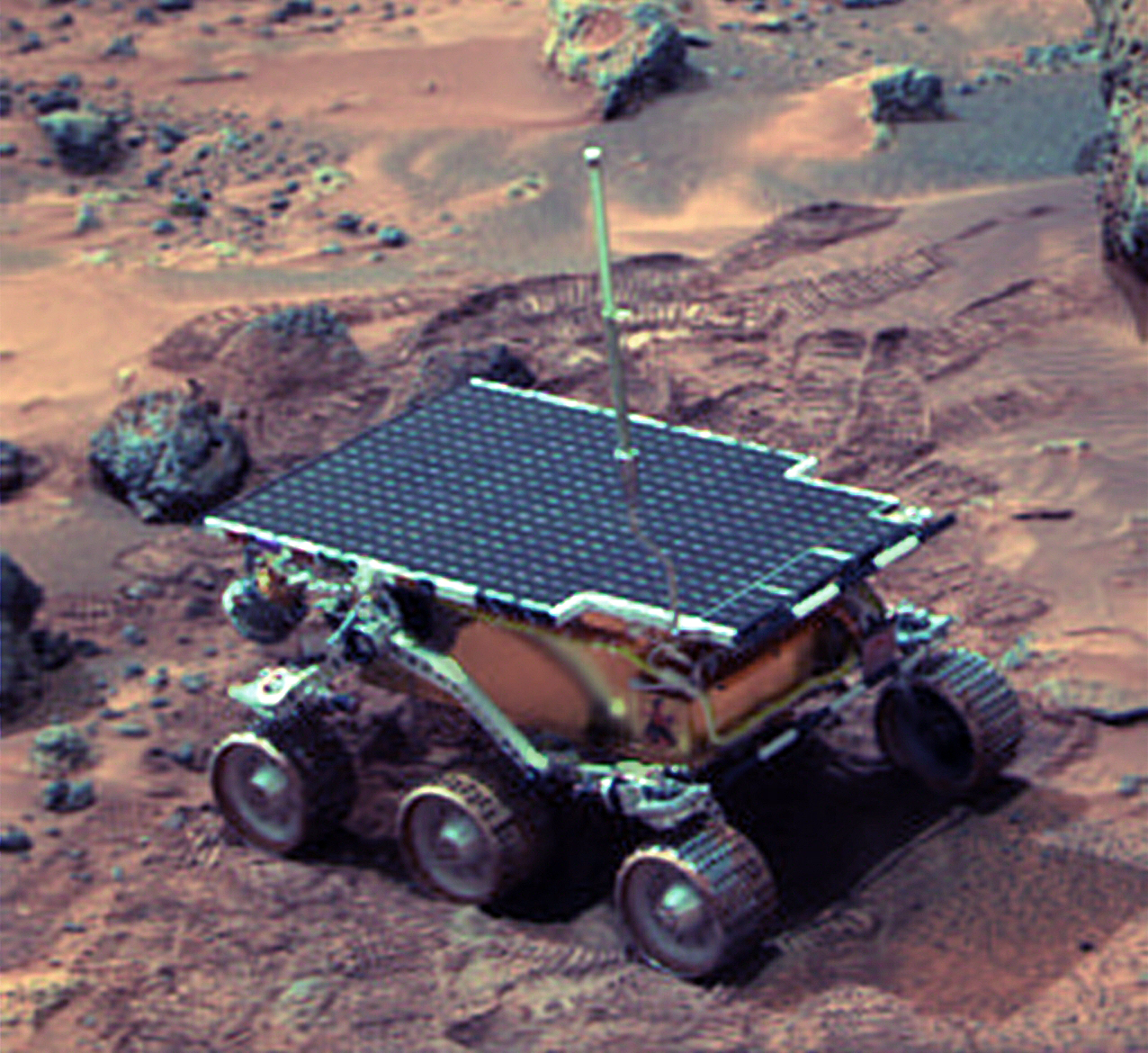
The Mars Pathfinder's Sojourner rover on Mars

NASA's Discovery Program (as compared to New Frontiers or Flagship Programs) is a series of lower-cost, highly focused scientific space missions that are exploring the Solar System. It was founded in 1992 to implement then-NASA Administrator Daniel S. Goldin's vision of "faster, better, cheaper" planetary missions. Discovery missions differ from traditional NASA missions where targets and objectives are pre-specified. Instead, these cost-capped missions are proposed and led by a scientist called the Principal investigator (PI). Proposing teams may include people from industry, small businesses, government laboratories, and universities. Proposals are selected through a competitive peer review process. The Discovery missions are adding significantly to the body of knowledge about the Solar System.

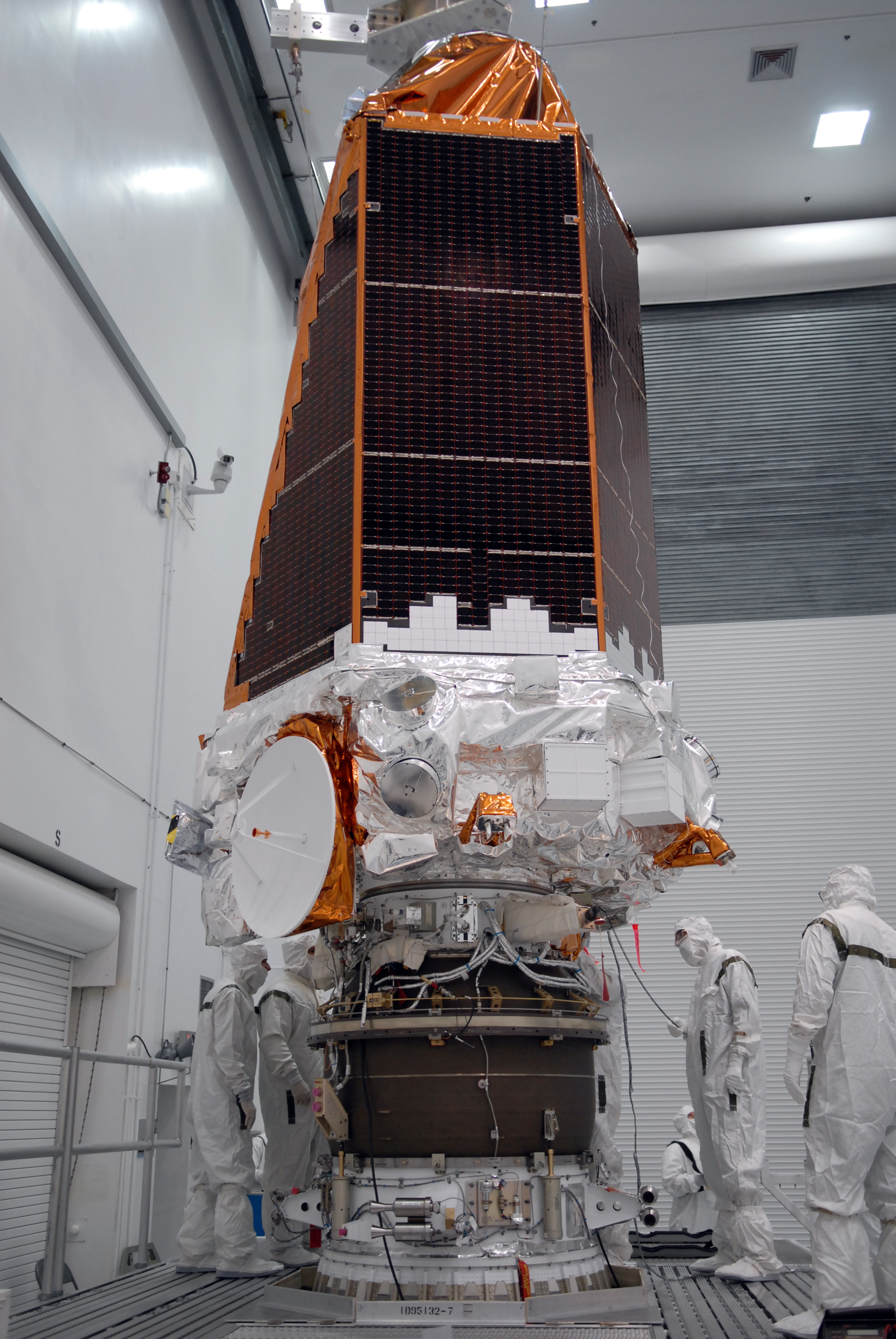
Kepler space telescope

NASA also accepts proposals for competitively selected Discovery Program Missions of Opportunity. This provides opportunities to participate in non-NASA missions by providing funding for a science instrument or hardware components of a science instrument or to re-purpose an existing NASA spacecraft.

Missions funded by NASA through this program include Mars Pathfinder, Kepler, Stardust, Genesis and Deep Impact.

The Mars Pathfinder (MESUR Pathfinder) was launched on December 4, 1996, just a month after the Mars Global Surveyor was launched. On board the lander, later renamed the Carl Sagan Memorial Station, was a small rover called Sojourner that executed many experiments on the Martian surface. It was the second project from NASA's Discovery Program. The mission was directed by the Jet Propulsion Laboratory, a division of the California Institute of Technology, responsible for NASA's Mars Exploration Program.

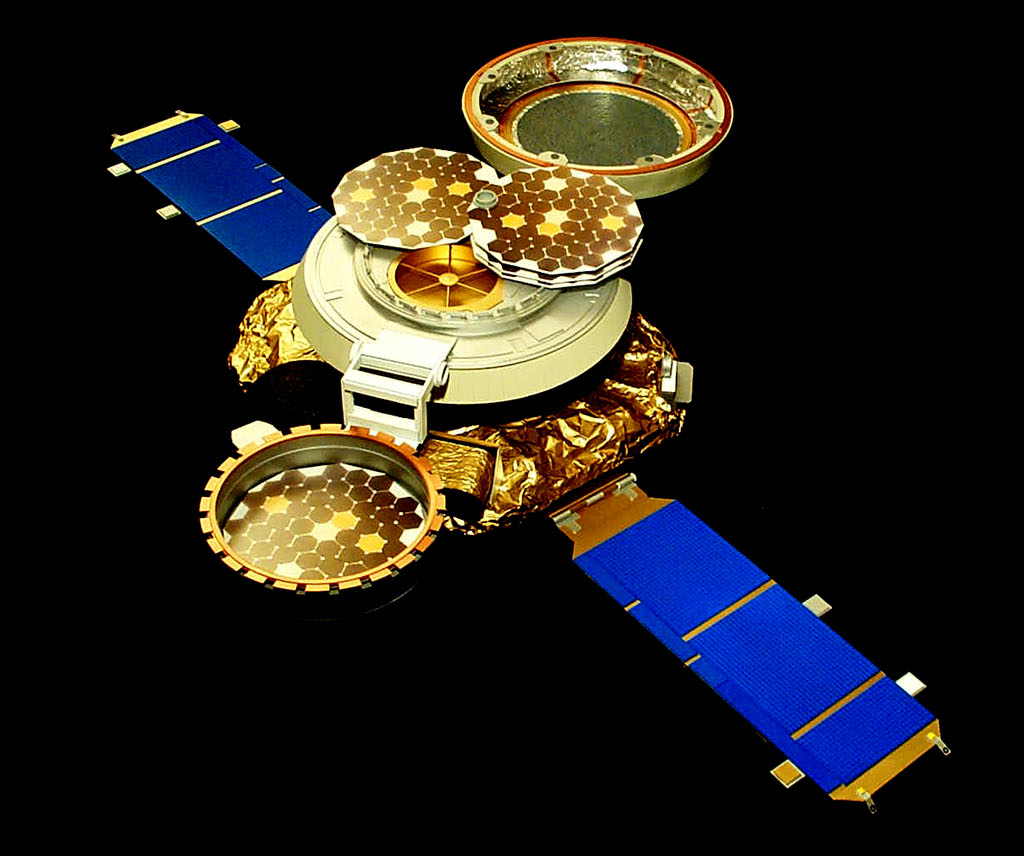
Genesis spacecraft

Stardust was a 300-kilogram robotic space probe launched by NASA on February 7, 1999, to study the asteroid 5535 Annefrank and collect samples from the coma of comet Wild 2. The primary mission was completed January 15, 2006, when the sample return capsule returned to Earth. Stardust intercepted comet Tempel 1 on February 15, 2011, a small Solar System body previously visited by Deep Impact on July 4, 2005. Stardust was decommissioned on March 25, 2011. It is the first sample return mission to collect cosmic dust.

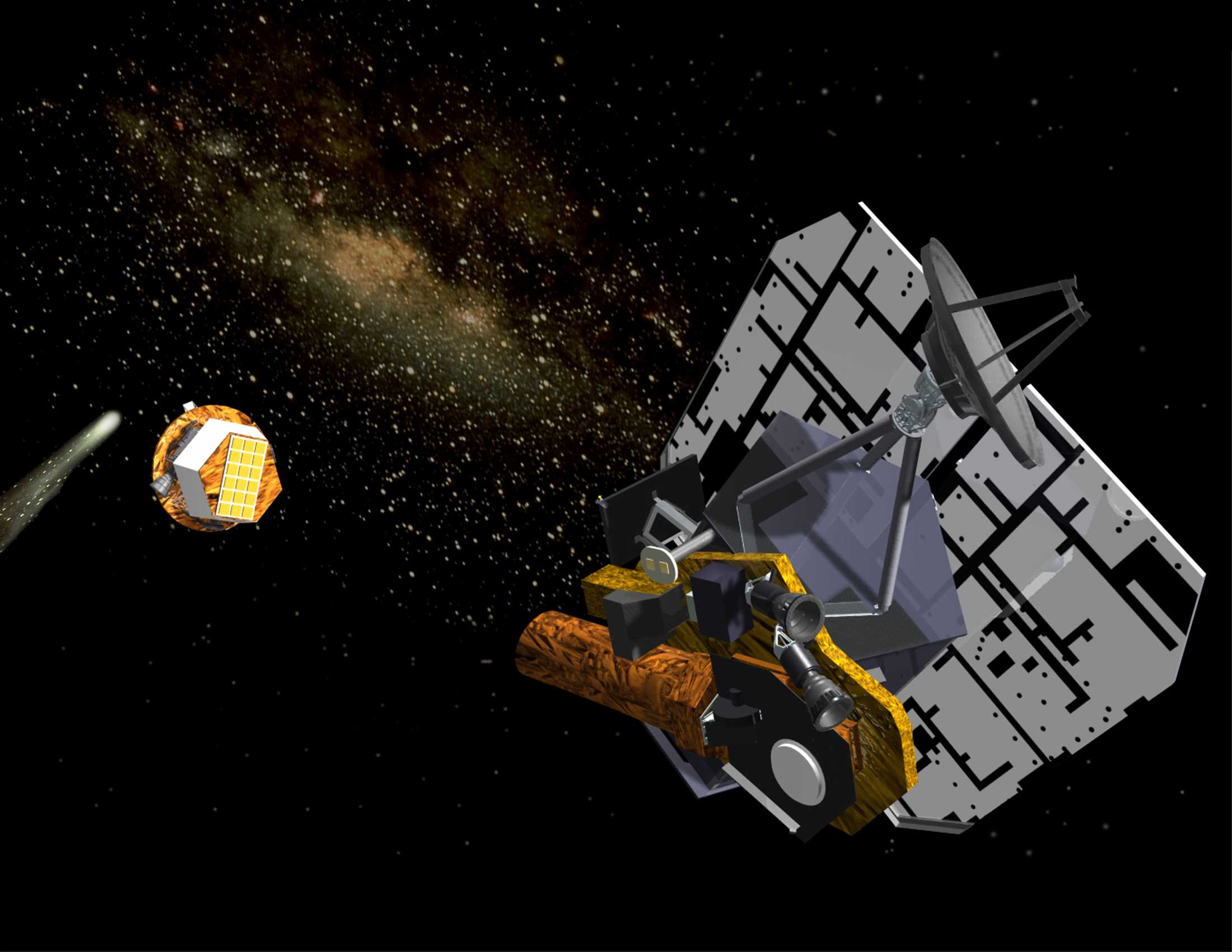
Deep Impact space probe after impactor separation (artist concept)

The Genesis spacecraft was a NASA sample return probe which collected a sample of solar wind and returned it to Earth for analysis. It was the first NASA sample return mission to return material since the Apollo Program, and the first to return material from beyond the orbit of the Moon. Genesis was launched on August 8, 2001, and crash-landed in Utah on September 8, 2004, after a design flaw prevented the deployment of its drogue parachute. The crash contaminated and damaged many of the sample collectors, but many of them were successfully recovered.

Deep Impact is a NASA space probe launched on January 12, 2005. It was designed to study the composition of the interior of comet 9P/Tempel, by releasing an impactor into the comet. On July 4, 2005, the impactor successfully collided with the comet's nucleus, excavating debris from the interior of the nucleus. Photographs of the debris and impact crater showed that the comet was very porous and its outgassing was chemically diverse.

Kepler is a space observatory launched by NASA to discover Earth-like planets orbiting other stars. The spacecraft, named in honor of the 17th-century German astronomer Johannes Kepler, was launched in March 2009. Kepler's primary mission ended in May 2013 when it lost a second reaction wheel. The telescope's second mission, K2, began in May 2014. As of February 2018, Kepler has discovered more than 2000 exoplanets.

=== Clementine (1994) ===
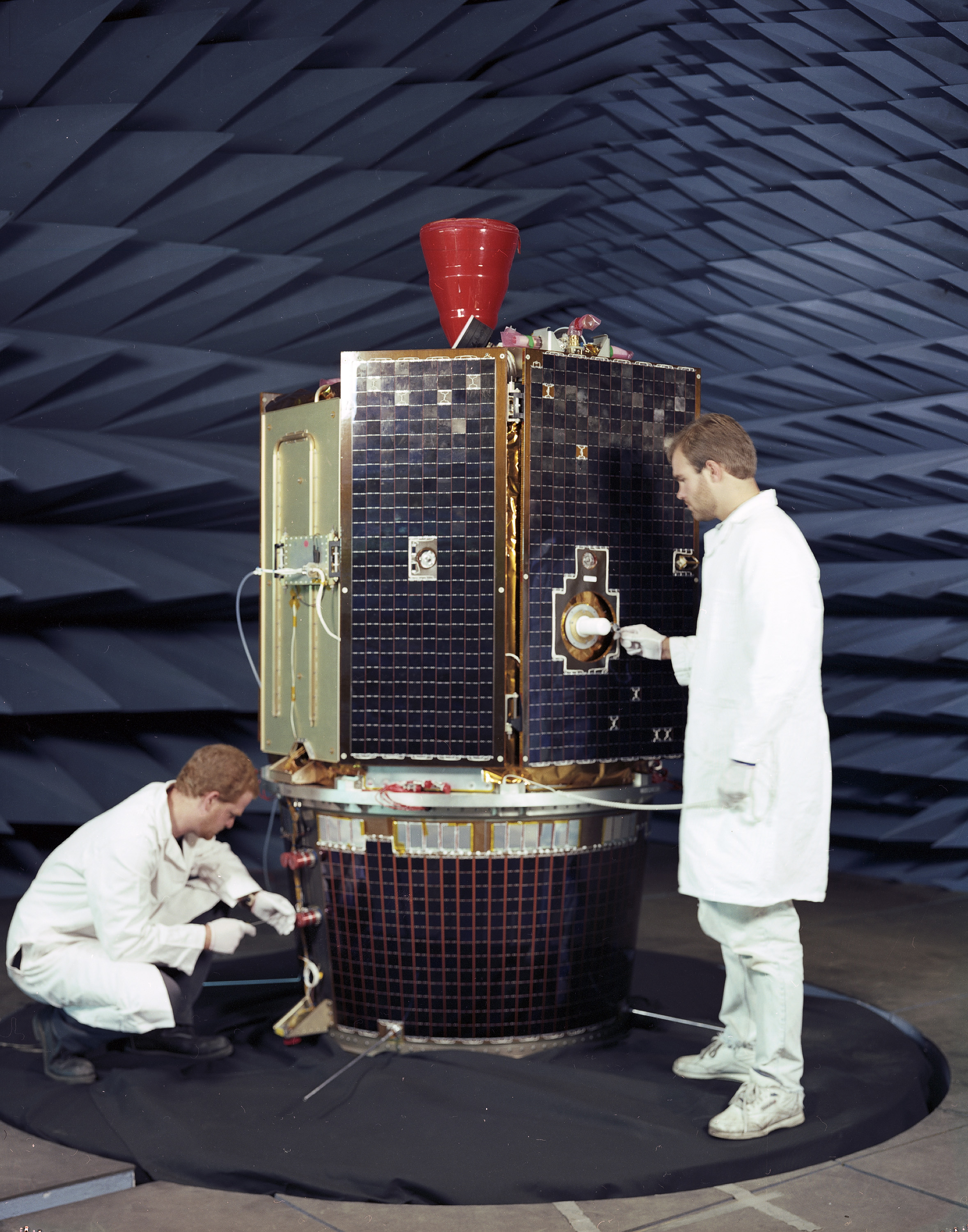
Clementine satellite

Clementine (officially called the Deep Space Program Science Experiment (DSPSE)) was a joint space project between the Ballistic Missile Defense Organization (BMDO, previously the Strategic Defense Initiative Organization, or SDIO) and NASA. Launched on January 25, 1994, the objective of the mission was to test sensors and spacecraft components under extended exposure to the space environment and to make scientific observations of the Moon and the near-Earth asteroid 1620 Geographos. The Geographos observations were not made due to a malfunction in the spacecraft.

=== Mars Global Surveyor (1996) ===
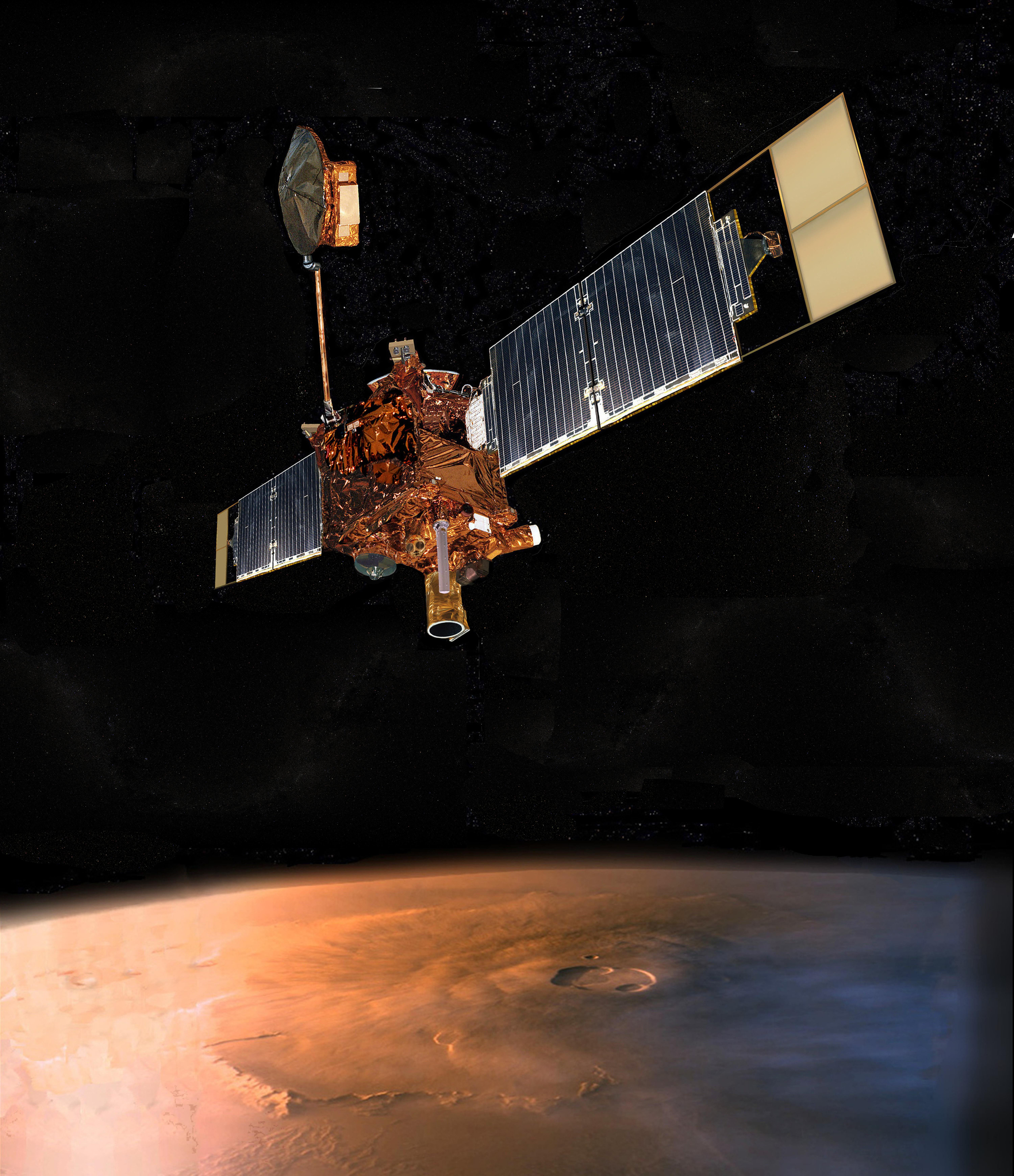
Artist's conception of the Mars Global Surveyor

The Mars Global Surveyor (MGS) was developed by NASA's Jet Propulsion Laboratory and launched November 1996. It began the United States' return to Mars after a 10-year absence. It completed its primary mission in January 2001 and was in its third extended mission phase when, on November 2, 2006, the spacecraft failed to respond to commands. In January 2007 NASA officially ended the mission.

The Surveyor spacecraft used a series of high-resolution cameras to explore the surface of Mars, returning more than 240,000 images from September 1997 to November 2006. The surveyor had three cameras; a high-resolution camera took black-and-white images (usually 1.5 to 12 m per pixel), and red and blue wide-angle cameras took images for context (240 m per pixel) and daily global images (7.5 kilometers (4.7 mi) per pixel).

=== Cassini–Huygens (1997–2017) ===
Artist's concept of Cassini's Saturn orbit insertion

Cassini–Huygens was a joint NASA/ESA/ASI spacecraft mission studying the planet Saturn and its many natural satellites. It included a Saturn orbiter and an atmospheric probe/lander for the moon Titan, although it also returned data on a wide variety of other things including the Heliosphere, Jupiter, and relativity tests. The Titan probe, Huygens, entered and landed on Titan in 2005. Cassini was the fourth space probe to visit Saturn and the first to enter orbit.

It launched on October 15, 1997, on a Titan IVB/Centaur and entered into orbit around Saturn on July 1, 2004, after an interplanetary voyage which included flybys of Earth, Venus, and Jupiter. On December 25, 2004, Huygens separated from the orbiter at approximately 02:00 UTC. It reached Saturn's moon Titan on January 14, 2005, when it entered Titan's atmosphere and descended down to the surface. It successfully returned data to Earth, using the orbiter as a relay. This was the first landing ever accomplished in the outer Solar System.

Sixteen European countries and the United States made up the team responsible for designing, building, flying and collecting data from the Cassini orbiter and Huygens probe. The mission was managed by NASA's Jet Propulsion Laboratory in the United States, where the orbiter was assembled. Huygens was developed by the European Space Research and Technology Centre.

After several mission extensions, Cassini was deliberately plunged into Saturn's atmosphere on September 15, 2017, to prevent contamination of habitable moons.

=== Earth Observing System (1997–present) ===
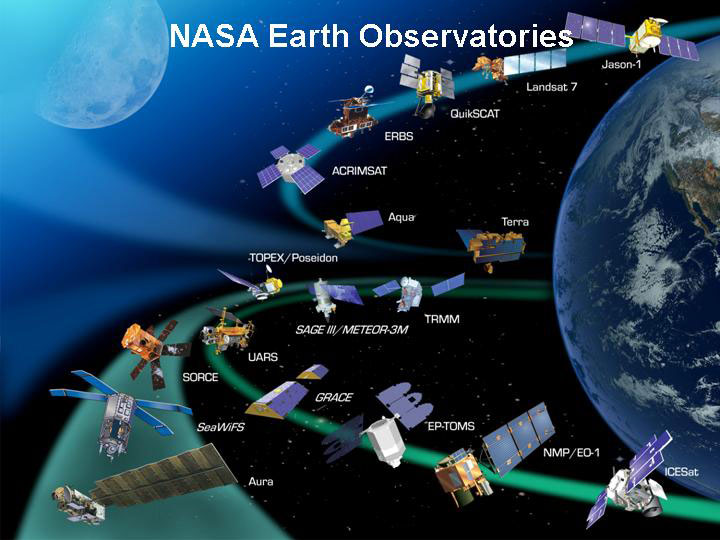
NASA Earth observatories

The Earth Observing System (EOS) is a program of NASA comprising a series of artificial satellite missions and scientific instruments in Earth orbit designed for long-term global observations of the land surface, biosphere, atmosphere, and oceans of the Earth. The satellite component of the program was launched in 1997. The program is the centerpiece of NASA's Earth Science Enterprise (ESE). Missions carried out through this program include SeaWiFS (1997), Landsat 7 (1999), QuikSCAT (1999), Jason 1 (2001), GRACE (2002), Aqua (2002), Aura (2004) and Aquarius (2011).

=== New Millennium Program (1998–2006) ===
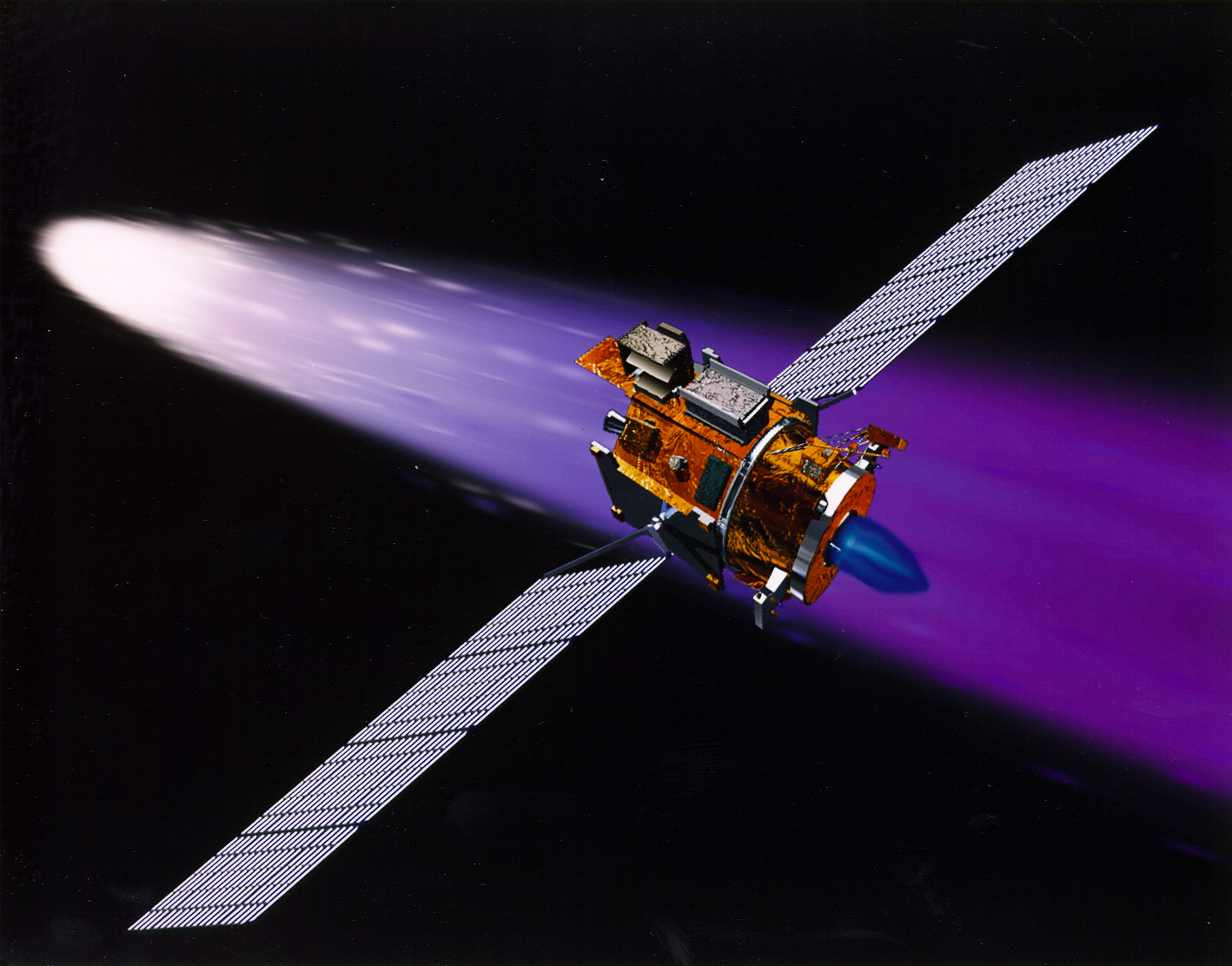
Artist rendering of Deep Space I's flyby of comet 19P/Borrelly

New Millennium Program (NMP) is a NASA project with a focus on engineering validation of new technologies for space applications. Funding for the program was eliminated from the FY2009 budget by the 110th United States Congress, effectively leading to its cancellation. The spacecraft in the New Millennium Program were originally named "Deep Space" (for missions demonstrating technology for planetary missions) and "Earth Observing" (for missions demonstrating technology for Earth-orbiting missions). With a refocusing of the program in 2000, the Deep Space series was renamed "Space Technology."

Deep Space 1 (DS1) is a spacecraft dedicated to testing a payload of advanced, high-risk technologies. Launched on October 24, 1998, the Deep Space 1 mission carried out a flyby of asteroid 9969 Braille, the mission's science target. Its mission was extended twice to include an encounter with Comet Borrelly and further engineering testing. Problems during its initial stages and with its star tracker led to repeated changes in mission configuration. Deep Space 1 tested twelve technologies. It was the first spacecraft to use ion thrusters, in contrast to the traditional chemical powered rockets.

The Deep Space series was continued by the Deep Space 2 probes, which were launched in January 1999 on Mars Polar Lander and were intended to strike the surface of Mars.

=== Gravity Recovery and Climate Experiment (2002) ===
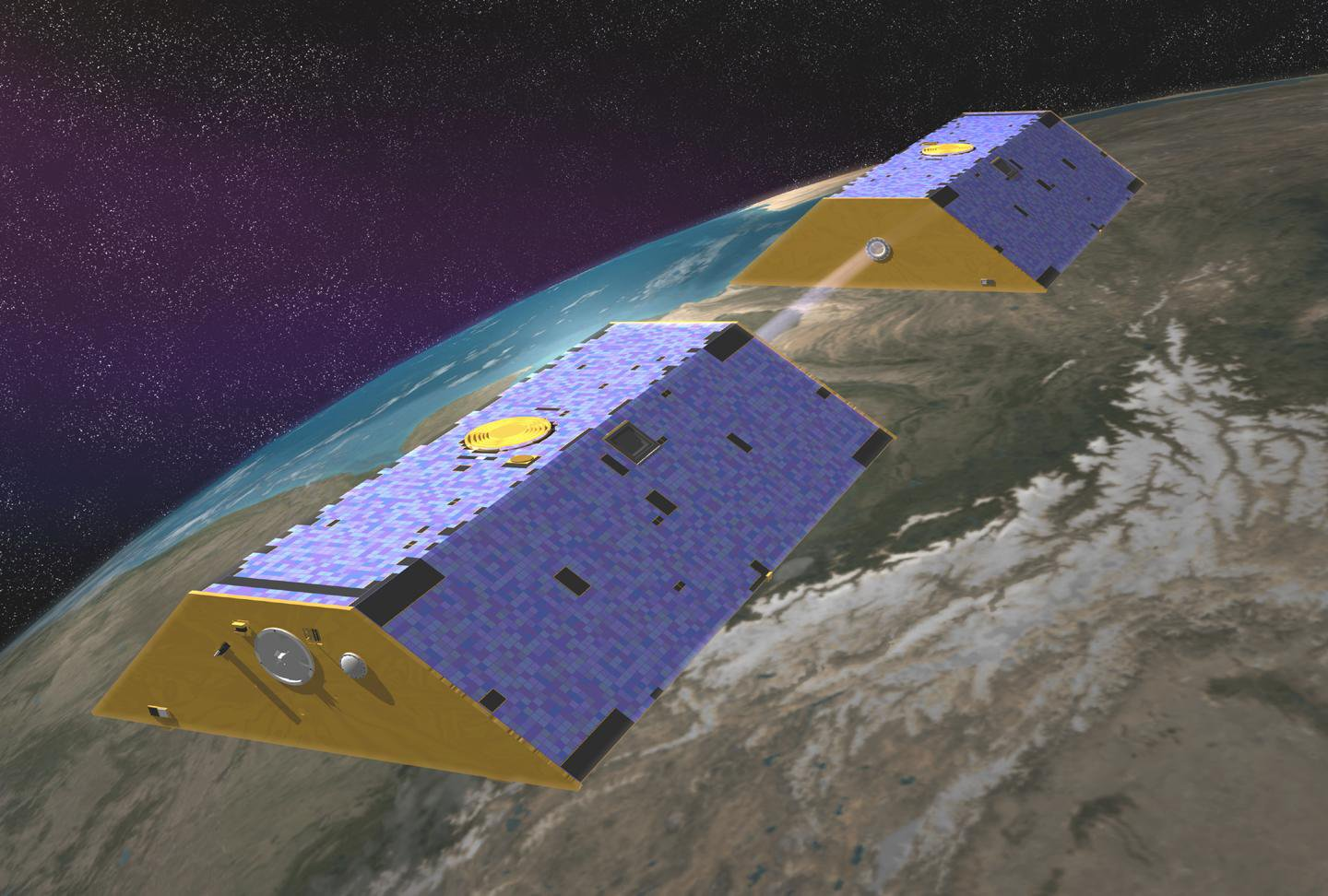
Artist's concept of the twin GRACE satellites

The Gravity Recovery and Climate Experiment (GRACE), a joint mission of NASA and the German Aerospace Center, made detailed measurements of Earth's gravity field from its launch in March 2002 until October 2017. The satellites were launched from Plesetsk Cosmodrome, Russia on a Rockot launch vehicle. By measuring gravity, GRACE showed how mass is distributed around the planet and how it varies over time. Data from the GRACE satellites is an important tool for studying Earth's ocean, geology, and climate.

GRACE was a collaborative endeavor involving the Center for Space Research at the University of Texas, Austin; NASA's Jet Propulsion Laboratory, Pasadena, Calif.; the German Space Agency and Germany's National Research Center for Geosciences, Potsdam. The Jet Propulsion Laboratory was responsible for the overall mission management under the NASA ESSP program.

=== Mars Exploration Rover (2003–2019) ===
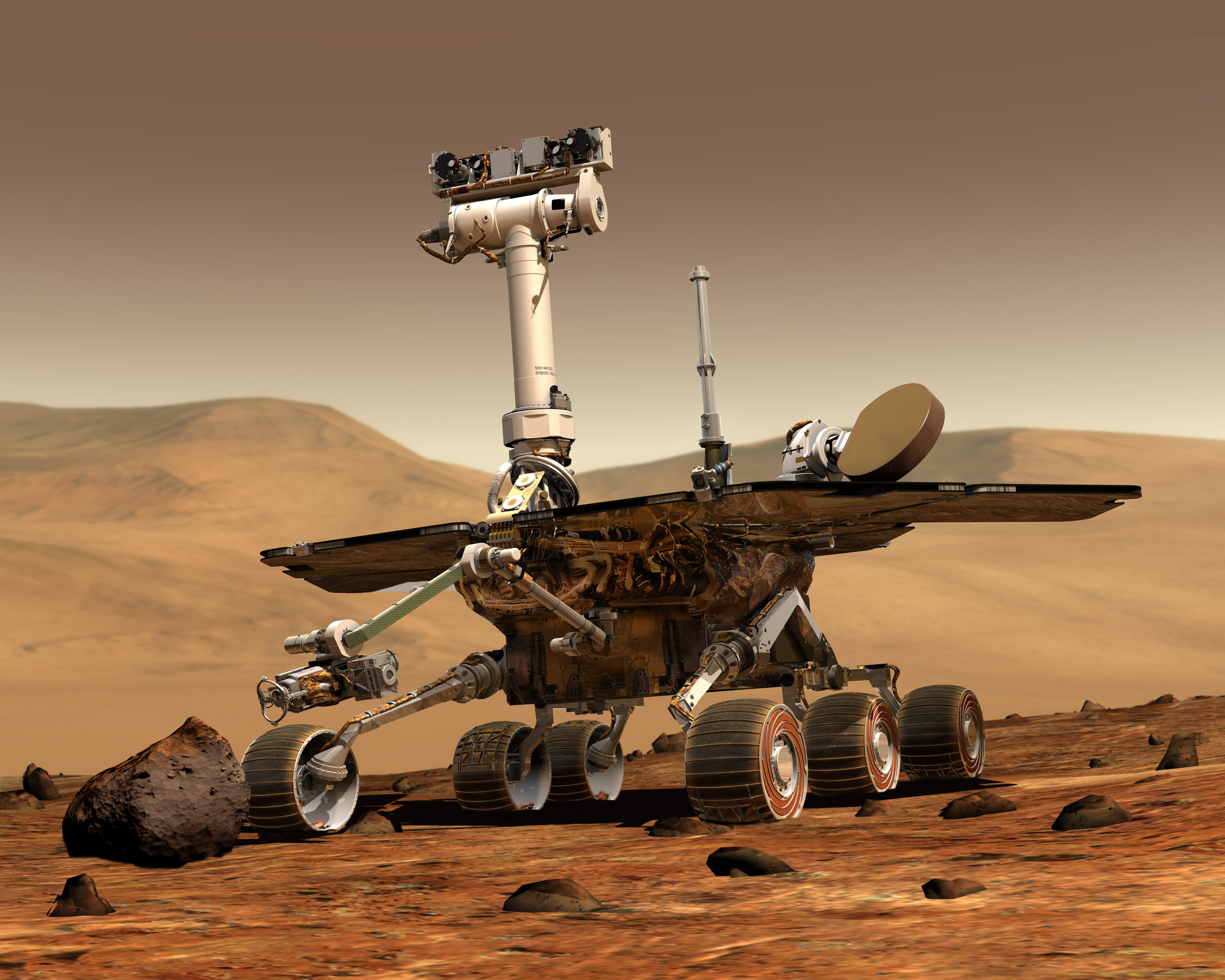
Artist's conception of MER on Mars

NASA's Mars Exploration Rover Mission (MER), was a robotic space mission involving two rovers exploring the planet Mars. The mission is managed for NASA by the Jet Propulsion Laboratory, which designed, built and is operating the rovers.

The mission began in 2003 with the sending of the two rovers—MER-A Spirit and MER-B Opportunity—to explore the Martian surface and geology. The mission's scientific objective is to search for and study rocks and soils that indicate past water activity. The mission is part of NASA's Mars Exploration Program which includes three previous successful landers: the two Viking program landers in 1976 and Mars Pathfinder probe in 1997.

The total cost of building, launching, landing and operating the rovers on the surface for the initial 90-Martian-day (sol) primary mission was US$820 million. However, both rovers were able to continue functioning beyond the initial 90-day mission, and received multiple mission extensions. The Spirit rover remained operational until 2009, while the Opportunity rover remained operational until 2018.

=== MESSENGER (2004–2015) ===
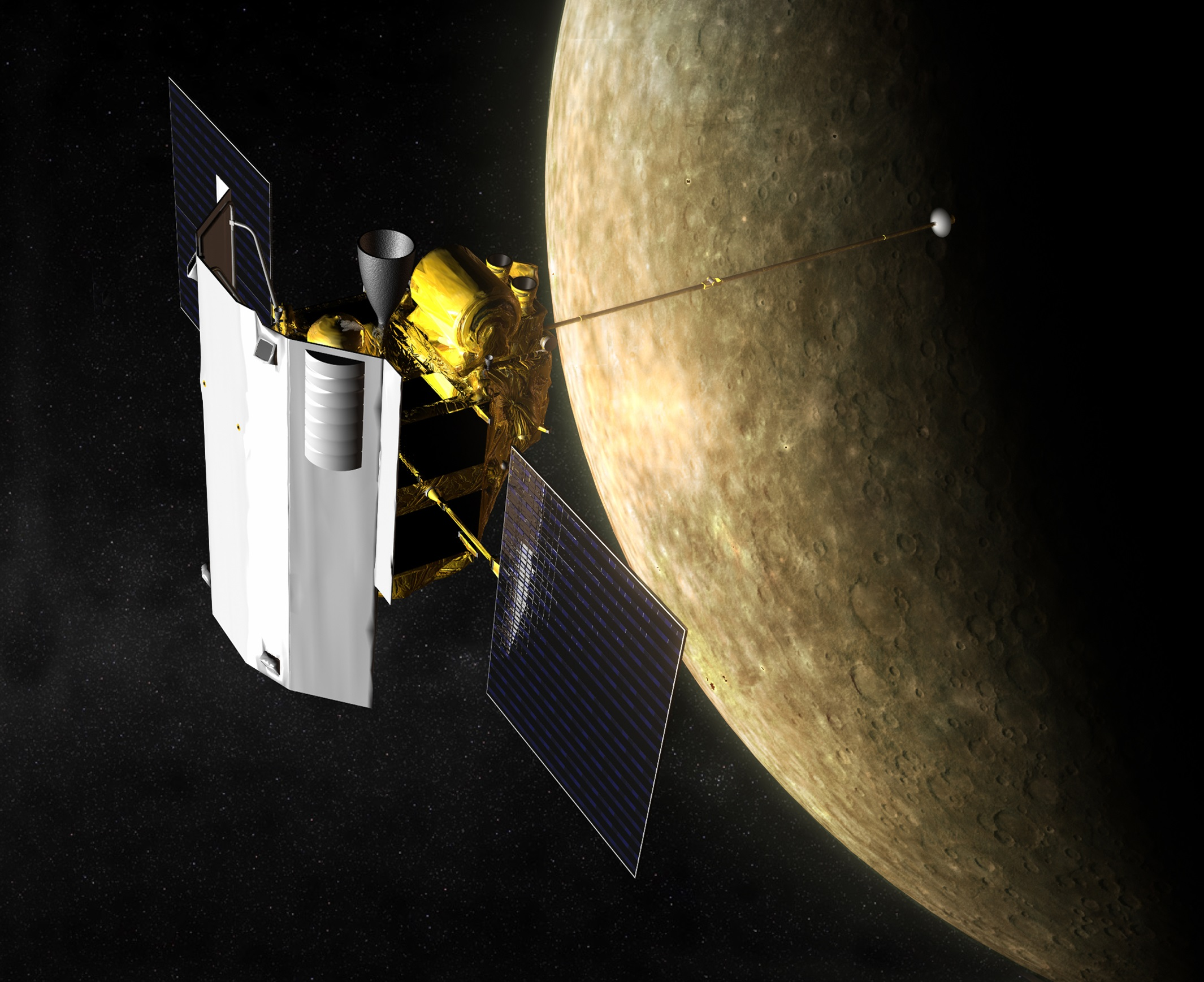
MESSENGER (artist concept)

MESSENGER (an acronym of MErcury Surface, Space ENvironment, GEochemistry, and Ranging) was a robotic spacecraft that orbited the planet Mercury, the first spacecraft to do so. The 485-kilogram (1,069 lb) spacecraft was launched aboard a Delta II rocket in August 2004 to study Mercury's chemical composition, geology, and magnetic field.

MESSENGER used its instruments on a complex series of flybys that allowed it to decelerate relative to Mercury using minimal fuel. The spacecraft flew by Earth once and Venus twice. Then it flew by Mercury three times, in January 2008, October 2008, and September 2009, becoming the second mission to reach Mercury, after Mariner 10. MESSENGER entered orbit around Mercury on March 18, 2011, and it reactivated its science instruments on March 24, returning the first photo from Mercury orbit on March 29.

MESSENGER crashed into Mercury on April 30, 2015, after running out of propellant.

=== New Frontiers program (2006–present) ===
The New Frontiers program is a series of space exploration missions being conducted by NASA with the purpose of researching several of the Sun's planets including Jupiter, Venus, and the dwarf planet Pluto. NASA is encouraging both domestic and international scientists to submit mission proposals for the project.

New Frontiers was built on the approach used by the Discovery and Explorer Programs of principal investigator-led missions. It is designed for medium-class missions that could not be accomplished within the cost and time constraints of the Discovery Program, but are not as large as Flagship-class missions. There are currently three New Frontiers missions in progress. New Horizons was launched on January 19, 2006, and flew by Pluto in July 2015. A flyby of 486958 Arrokoth took place in 2019. Juno was launched on August 5, 2011, and entered orbit around Jupiter on July 4, 2016. OSIRIS-REx, launched on September 8, 2016, plans on returning a sample to Earth on September 24, 2023, and if successful, would be the first U.S. spacecraft to do so.

=== Commercial Resupply Services (2006–present) ===
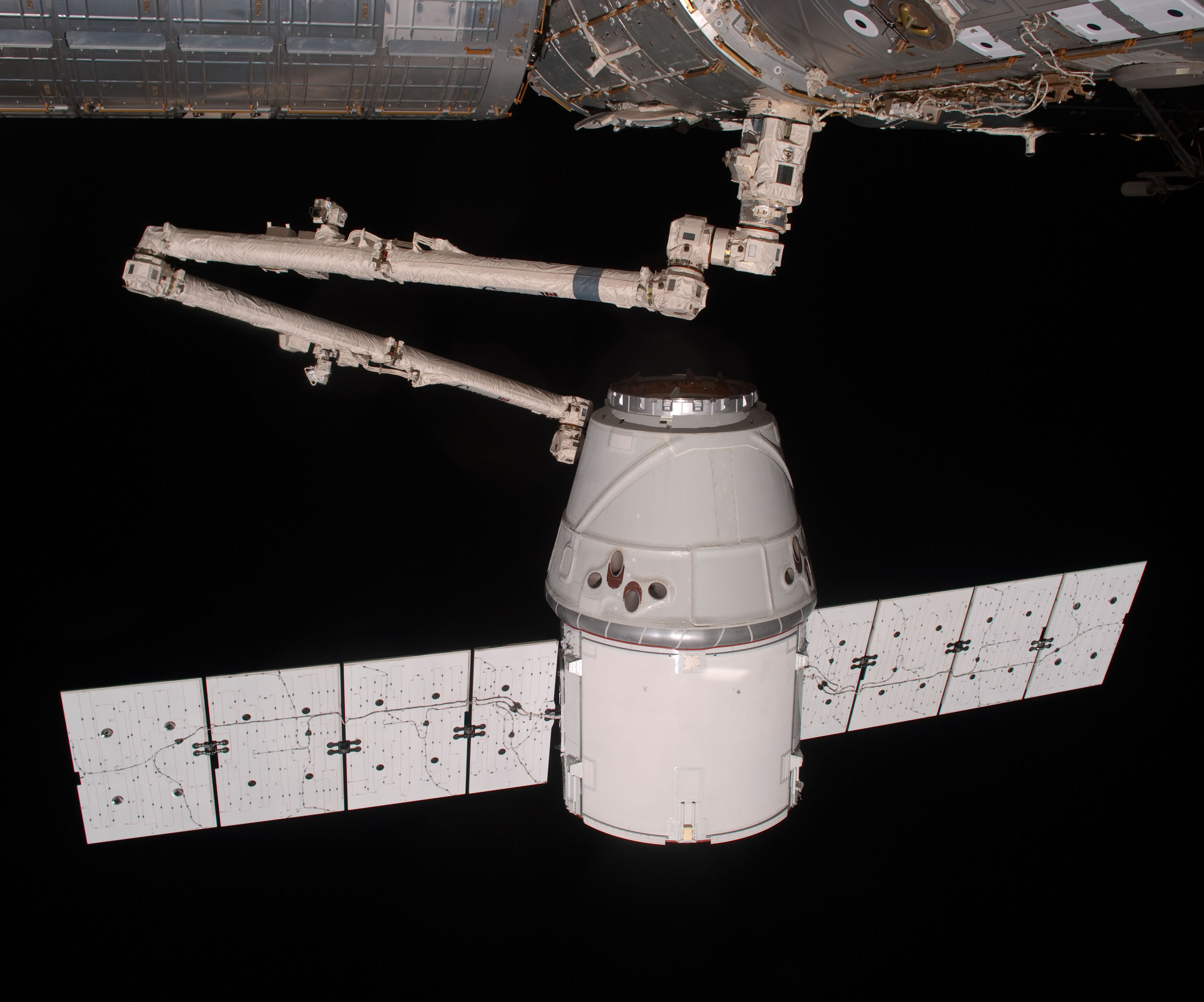
Dragon being berthed to the ISS in May 2012

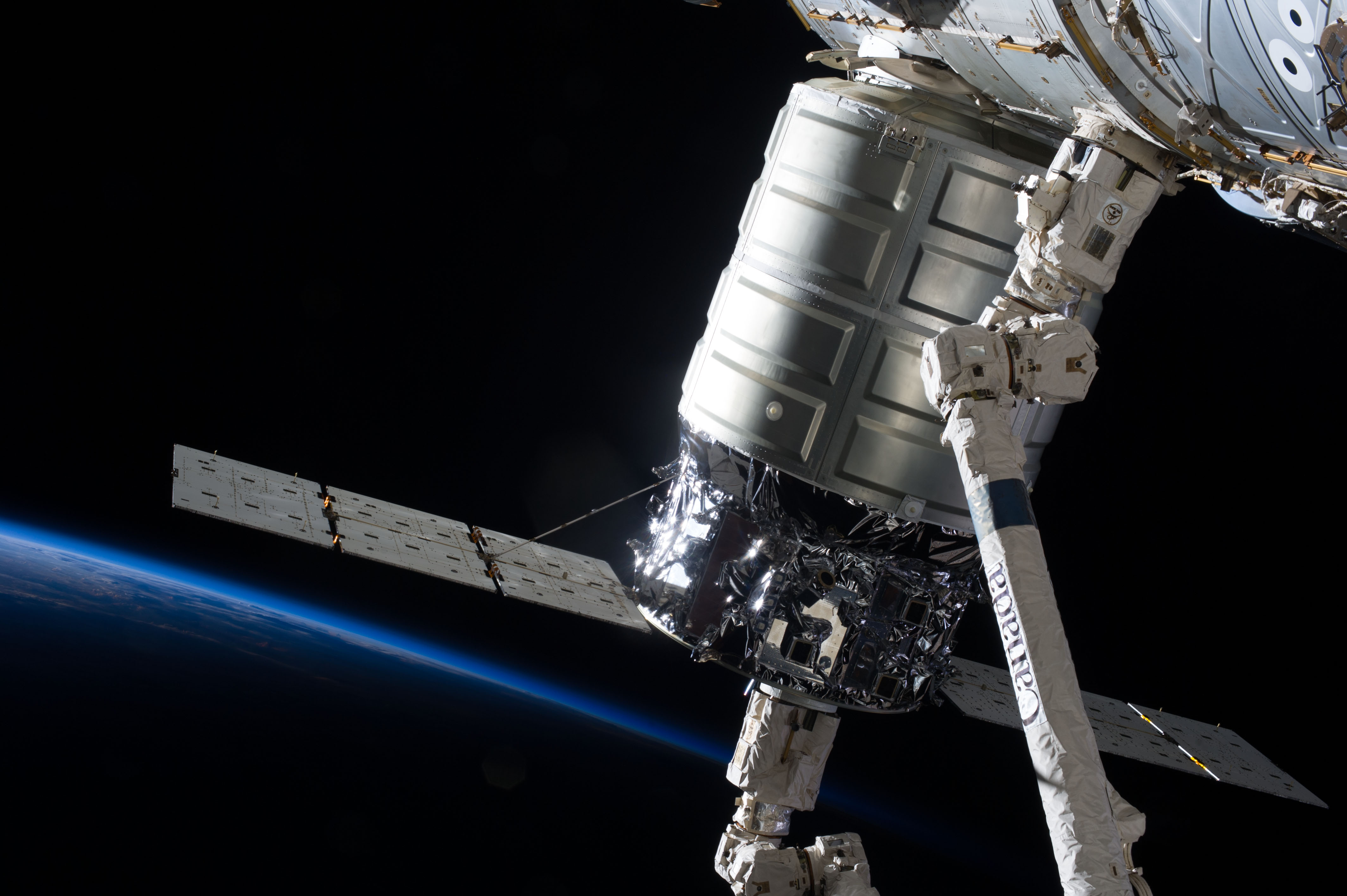
Cygnus berthed to the ISS in September 2013

The development of the Commercial Resupply Services (CRS) vehicles began in 2006 with the purpose of creating American commercially operated uncrewed cargo vehicles to service the ISS. The development of these vehicles was under a fixed-price, milestone-based program, meaning that each company that received a funded award had a list of milestones with a dollar value attached to them that they did not receive until after they had successfully completed the milestone. Companies were also required to raise an unspecified amount of private investment for their proposal.

On December 23, 2008, NASA awarded Commercial Resupply Services contracts to SpaceX and Orbital Sciences Corporation. SpaceX uses its Falcon 9 rocket and Dragon spacecraft. Orbital Sciences uses its Antares rocket and Cygnus spacecraft. The first Dragon resupply mission occurred in May 2012. The first Cygnus resupply mission occurred in September 2013. The CRS program now provides for all America's ISS cargo needs, with the exception of a few vehicle-specific payloads that are delivered on the European ATV and the Japanese HTV.

=== Mars Scout Program (2007–2008) ===
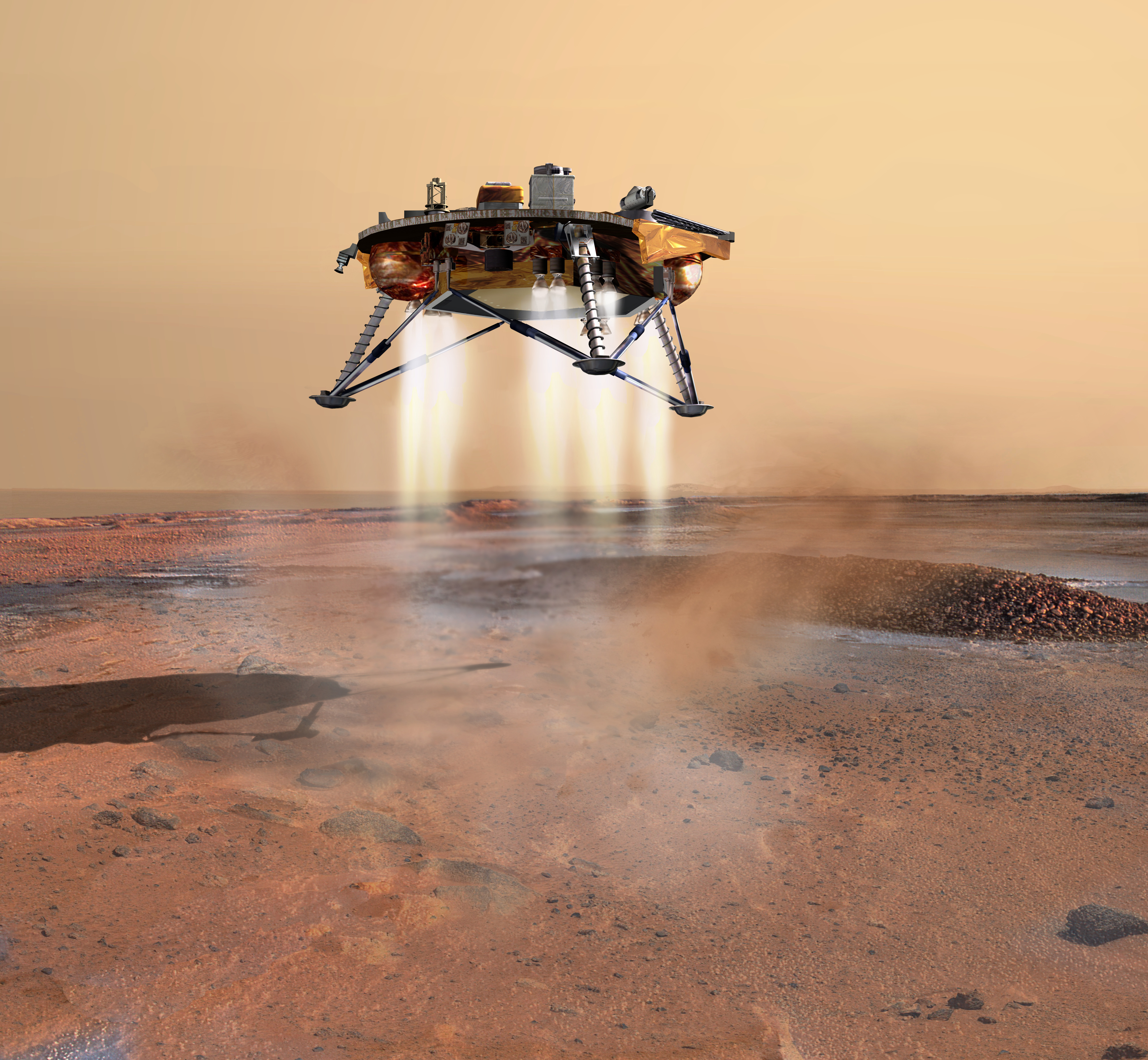
Artist's impression of the Phoenix spacecraft as it lands on Mars

The Mars Scout Program was a NASA initiative to send a series of small, low-cost robotic missions to Mars, competitively selected from proposals by the scientific community. Each Scout project was to cost less than US$485 million. The Phoenix lander and MAVEN orbiter were selected and developed before the program was retired in 2010.

Phoenix was a lander adapted from the canceled Mars Surveyor mission. Phoenix was launched on August 4, 2007, and landed in the icy northern polar region of the planet on May 25, 2008. Phoenix was designed to search for environments suitable for microbial life on Mars and to research the history of water there. The 90-day primary mission was successful, and the overall mission was concluded on November 10, 2008, after engineers were unable to contact the craft. The lander last made a brief communication with Earth on November 2, 2008.

=== Dawn (2007–2018) ===
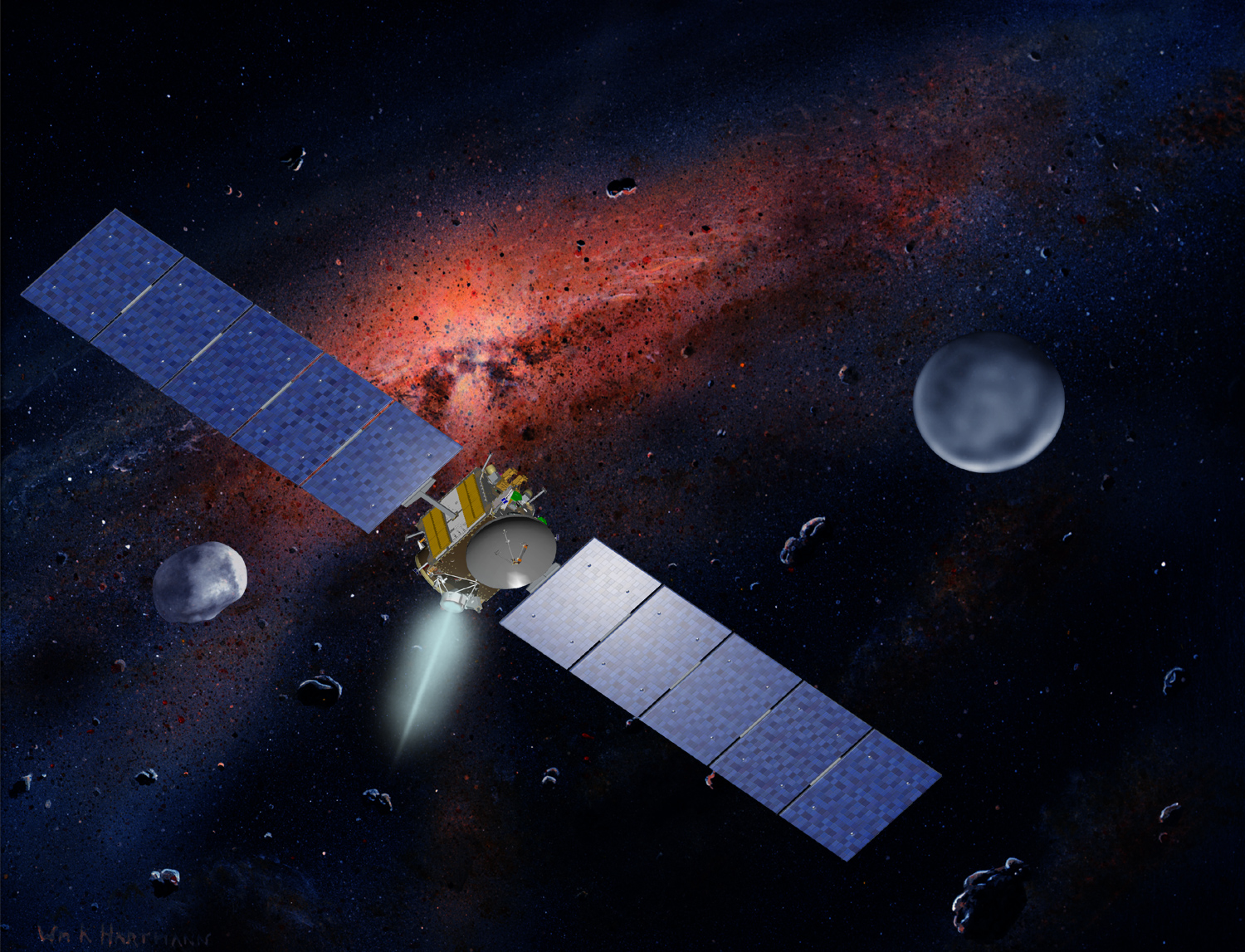
Dawn, artist concept

Dawn is a NASA spacecraft tasked with the exploration and study of the asteroid Vesta and the dwarf planet Ceres, the two largest members of the asteroid belt. The spacecraft was constructed with some European cooperation, with components contributed by partners in Germany, Italy, and the Netherlands. The Dawn mission is managed by NASA's Jet Propulsion Laboratory.

Dawn is the first spacecraft to visit either Vesta or Ceres. It is also the first spacecraft to orbit two separate extraterrestrial bodies, using ion thrusters to travel between its targets. Previous multi-target missions using conventional drives, such as the Voyager program, were restricted to flybys.

Launched on September 27, 2007, Dawn entered orbit around Vesta on July 16, 2011, and explored it until September 5, 2012. Thereafter, the spacecraft headed to Ceres and started to orbit the dwarf planet on March 6, 2015. In November 2018, NASA reported that Dawn had run out of fuel, effectively ending its mission; it will remain in orbit around Ceres, but can no longer communicate with Earth.

=== Lunar Reconnaissance Orbiter (2009–present) ===
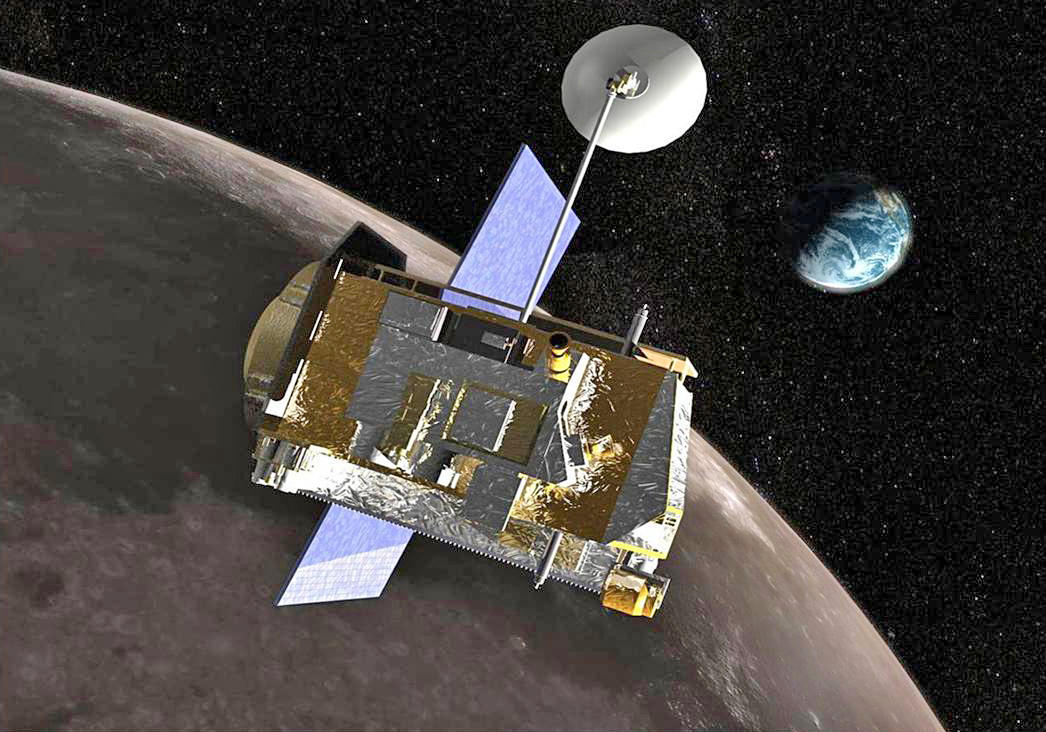
Lunar Reconnaissance Orbiter, artist concept

The Lunar Reconnaissance Orbiter (LRO) is a NASA robotic spacecraft currently orbiting the Moon on a low 50 km polar mapping orbit. The LRO mission is a precursor to future human missions to the Moon by NASA. To this end, a detailed mapping program identifies safe landing sites, locates potential resources on the Moon, characterizes the radiation environment, and demonstrates new technology. The probe has made a 3-D map of the Moon's surface and has provided some of the first images of Apollo equipment left on the Moon. The first images from LRO were published on July 2, 2009, showing a region in the lunar highlands south of Mare Nubium (Sea of Clouds).

Launched on June 18, 2009, in conjunction with the Lunar Crater Observation and Sensing Satellite (LCROSS), as the vanguard of NASA's Lunar Precursor Robotic Program, this is the first United States mission to the Moon in over ten years. LRO and LCROSS are the first missions launched as part of the United States's Vision for Space Exploration program.

In April 2022, NASA extended the LRO mission for it to continue to study the Moon's surface and geologic features and also investigate new regions enabled with the evolution of LRO's orbit

=== Mars Science Laboratory (2011–present) ===
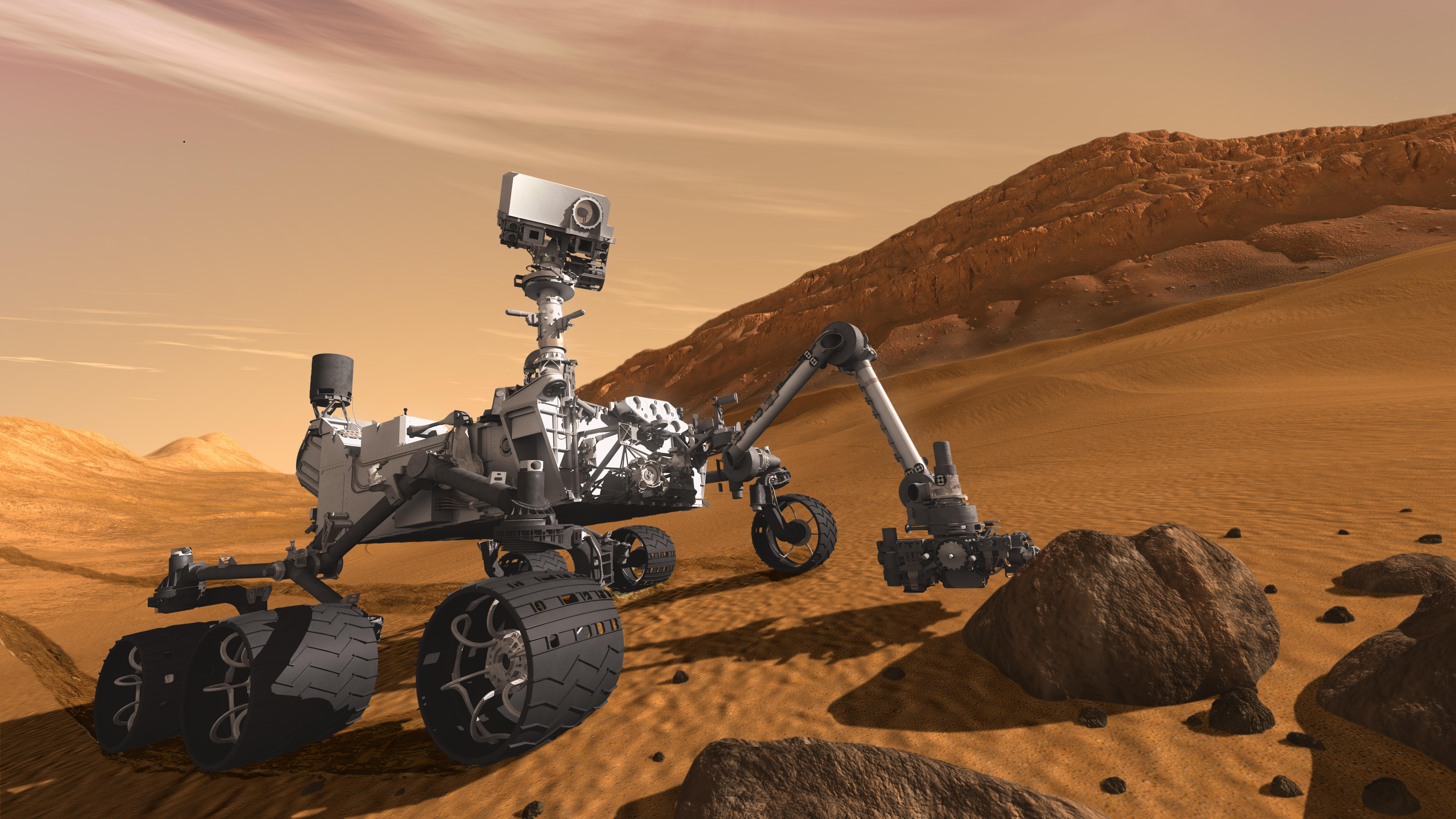
Mars Curiosity Rover, artist's concept

Mars Science Laboratory (MSL) is a NASA mission to land and operate a rover named Curiosity on the surface of Mars. It was launched by an Atlas V rocket on November 26, 2011, and landed successfully on August 6, 2012, on the plains of Aeolis Palus in Gale Crater near Aeolis Mons (formerly Mount Sharp). On Mars, it is helping to assess Mars' habitability. It can chemically analyze samples by scooping up soil and drilling rocks using a laser and sensor system.

The Curiosity rover is about two times longer and fives times more massive than the Spirit or Opportunity Mars Exploration Rovers and carries more than ten times the mass of scientific instruments.

=== Mars 2020 (2020–present) ===
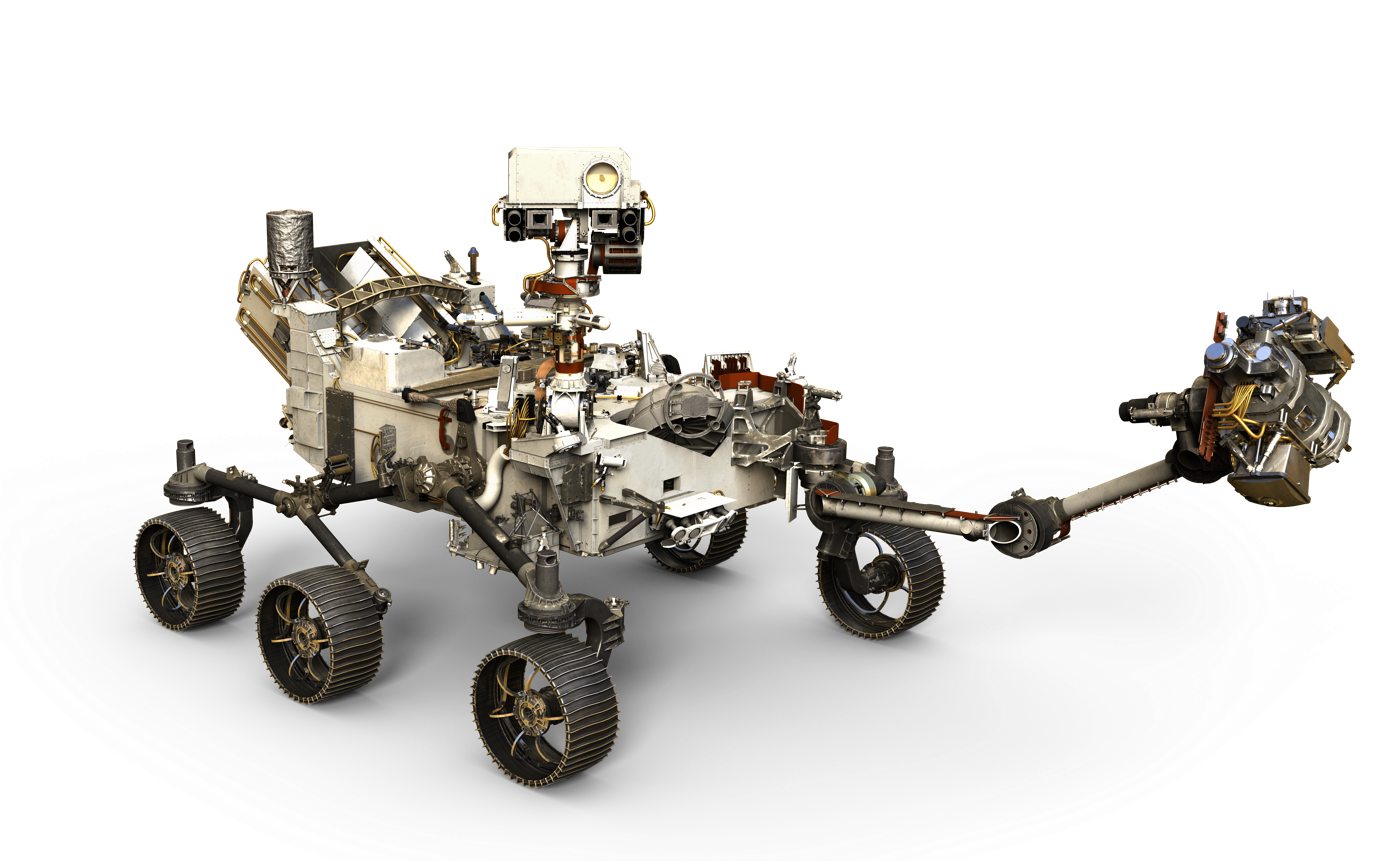
Computer-design drawing for NASA's Perseverance rover

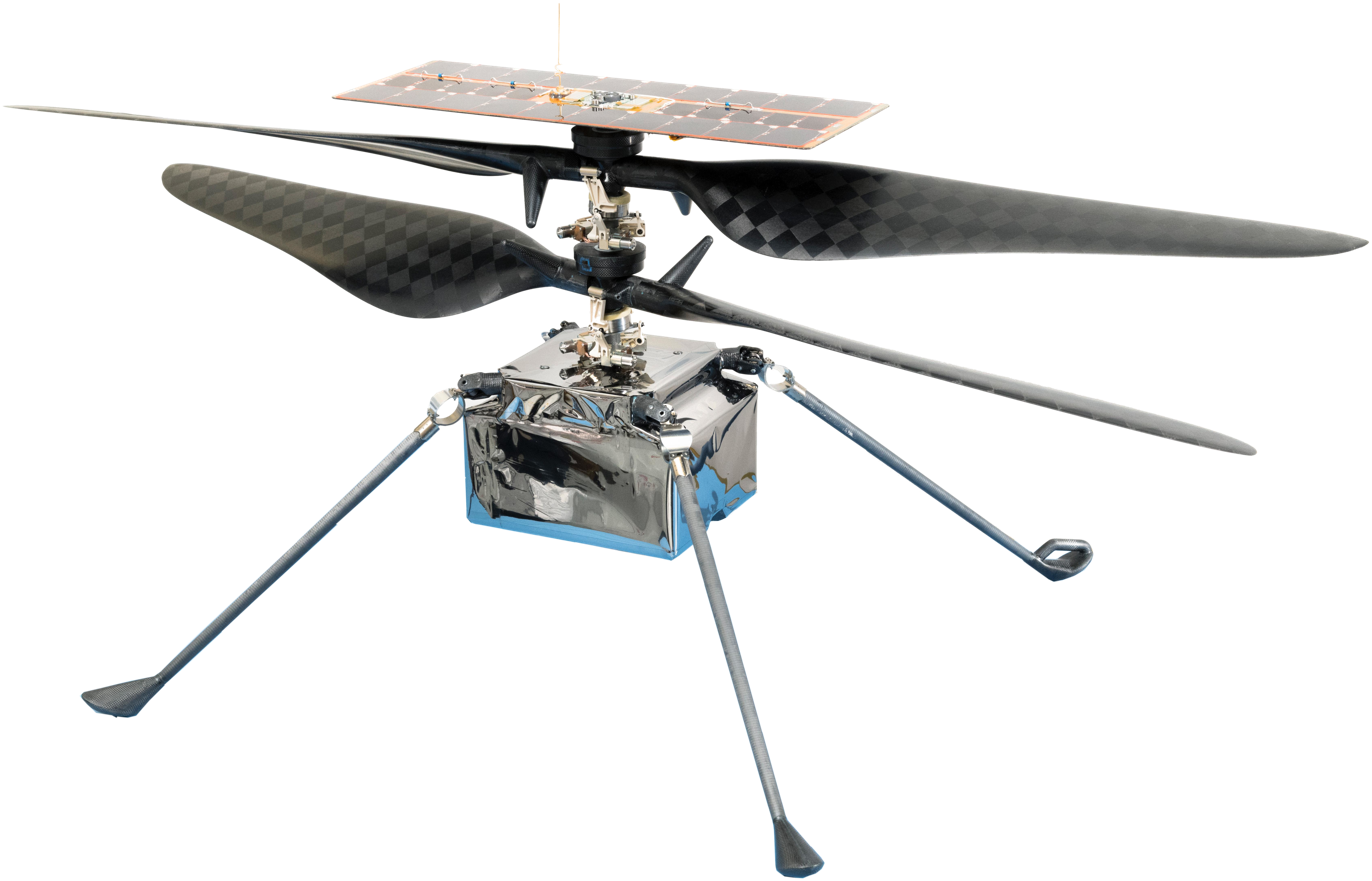
Artistic concept of Ingenuity helicopter

Mars 2020 is a Mars rover mission by NASA's Mars Exploration Program that includes the Perseverance rover which launched on 30 July 2020 at 11:50 UTC, and has touched down in Jezero crater on Mars on 18 February 2021 and deployed the Ingenuity helicopter on 4 April 2021. It will investigate an astrobiologically relevant ancient environment on Mars and investigate its surface geological processes and history, including the assessment of its past habitability, the possibility of past life on Mars, and the potential for preservation of biosignatures within accessible geological materials. It will cache sample containers along its route for a potential future Mars sample-return mission. The Mars 2020 mission was announced by NASA on 4 December 2012 at the fall meeting of the American Geophysical Union in San Francisco. The Perseverance rover's design is derived from the Curiosity rover, and will use many components already fabricated and tested, new scientific instruments and a core drill.

=== Commercial Lunar Payload Services (2023-present) ===
Commercial Lunar Payload Services (CLPS) is a NASA program to hire companies to send small robotic landers and rovers to the Moon's south polar region, mostly with the goals of scouting for lunar resources, testing in situ resource utilization (ISRU) concepts, and performing lunar science to support the Artemis lunar program. CLPS is intended to buy end-to-end payload services between Earth and the lunar surface using fixed-price contracts. The program was extended to add support for large payloads starting after 2025.

== See also ==
- NASA Launch Services Program
- Science Mission Directorate
