= Space Act Agreement =

Type of legal agreement with NASA

Space Act Agreements (abbreviated SAA) are a type of legal agreement specified in the National Aeronautics and Space Act of 1958 (and subsequent congressional authorizations) that uniquely empowers the National Aeronautics and Space Administration (NASA) to work with any entity that enables fulfillment of the Administration's mandate. As recently as the 2010 authorization of (Pub. L. 111–314 (text) (PDF)):

Contracts, Leases, and Agreements.--In the performance of its functions, the Administration is authorized, without regard to subsections (a) and (b) of section 3324 of title 31, to enter into and perform such contracts, leases, cooperative agreements, or other transactions as may be necessary in the conduct of its work and on such terms as it may deem appropriate, with any agency or instrumentality of the United States, or with any State, territory, or possession, or with any political subdivision thereof, or with any person, firm, association, corporation, or educational institution.

The Agency enters into SAAs with various partners to advance NASA mission and program objectives, including international cooperative space activities.

== Definitions for Agreement Types ==
- Reimbursable Agreements - Agreements where NASA's costs associated to the activity are reimbursed by the Agreement Partner (in full or in part). NASA undertakes Reimbursable Agreements when it has unique goods, services, and facilities that are not currently being fully utilized to accomplish mission needs. These may be made available to others on a noninterference basis and consistent with the Agency's missions and policies.
- Nonreimbursable Agreements - Agreements that involve NASA and one or more Agreement Partners in a mutually beneficial activity that furthers the Agency's Missions. Unlike Reimbursable Agreements, each partner bears the cost of its participation and no funds are exchanged between the parties.
- Funded Agreements - Agreements where appropriated funds are transferred to a domestic Agreement Partner to accomplish an Agency mission. Funded Agreements may be used only when the Agency's objective cannot be accomplished through the use of a procurement contract, grant, or cooperative agreement.
- International Agreements - Reimbursable or Nonreimbursable Agreements where the Agreement Partner is a foreign entity. The foreign partner may be a legal entity not established under a state or Federal law of the United States and may include a commercial or noncommercial entity or person or governmental entity of a foreign sovereign

== Examples of Space Act Agreements ==
=== Commercial Space Transportation Capabilities ===
Agreements of this type have been reached under the Commercial Orbital Transportation Services (COTS) and Commercial Crew Development (CCDev). They are not subject to normal Federal Acquisition Regulations.

Besides these two initiatives NASA has concluded five other agreements in the Commercial Space Transportation Capabilities (CSTC).

Five agreements were signed between January 2007 and June 2007:

- Planetspace for their Silver Dart lifting body launched by Canadian Arrow rocket
- tSpace for their Crew Transfer Vehicle (CXV) capsule launched from the now defunct AirLaunch LLC system
- Spacehab for their ARCTUS cargo delivery vehicle for the ISS that is based on existing US hardware
- SpaceDev for their Dream Chaser lifting body spaceplane
- Constellation Services International for their cargo delivery vehicle for the ISS that is based on existing Russian hardware

All three of the Space Act Agreement initiatives, COTS, CSTC and CCDev are for development, engineering and testing of design concepts, but CSTC is different from the other two initiatives in no providing any funding. CSTC agreements are only instruments committing NASA to increase cooperation and to support the private sector companies with information and other facilities, but this commitment is without financial implications and both sides (NASA and the private companies) should ensure by themselves the required funds for their respective parts of the activities.

==== Results ====
Four of the cooperation agreements signed are for a period of maximum 3 years which have lapsed in 2010. In the fifth one, that of SpaceDev, the period is censored.

So far NASA has published a list of accomplished progress milestones only for SpaceDev, and the same Dream Chaser spacecraft is also one of the winners (albeit with different milestones) of CCDev rounds 1 and 2.
