= S-550 =

Proposed Crewed Space Capsule

The S-550 was a proposed crewed space capsule, designed in 2005–06 at Venturer Aerospace, in response to the NASA Commercial Orbital Transportation Services (COTS) program to provide commercial resupply and logistics support for the International Space Station after the retirement of the Space Shuttle.

It was an outgrowth of earlier Venturer Aerospace crewed capsule research and development projects.

NASA did not select the design for further funded development, and the company has not to date proceeded to develop the vehicle with private funding. Venturer Aerospace did not participate in the second COTS program round in 2007.

== Description ==
Design depictions of the proposed S-550 capsule. Pictured on left: Capsule on SpaceX Falcon 9 launch vehicle. Center: Capsule, with service module, unpressurized cargo space, and launch vehicle adapter structure, underneath the Falcon 9 payload shroud. Upper right: Outline of the sphere-cone shape, with ISS Common Berthing Adapter at rear. Lower right: Internal components layout

The S-550 capsule was intended to carry up to six people (normally 2 or 3) and significant internal and external cargo on resupply missions to the International Space Station (ISS). Unlike the other COTS competitors, the S-550 capsule was explicitly a human-operated vehicle - while it had automated flight functions, it was intended to be flown with crews for any space station mission, with the crew in control for all rendezvous and dockings with ISS.

=== Design ===
The overall vehicle was design was for a 3.0 m (10 ft)-diameter ballistic capsule, weighing 7,500 kilograms (16,500 lb) including payloads. The capsule was projected to weigh 3,059 kg (6,744 lb) "wet" (with 2 crew and consumables, but not cargo), the service module 1,755 kg (3,869 lb) "wet" including rocket propellants, and 2,300 kg (5,100 lb) of internal cargo or passengers within the capsule. Additional mass in external unpressurized cargo could be obtained with increased launch vehicle capacity beyond 7,500 kg or by trading off internal cargo for external cargo.

==== Capsule shape ====
The S-550 capsule is a sphere-cone type lifting ballistic space capsule, similar to the shape of the film capsule reentry modules in the Corona spy satellite, but much larger. The general shape was also used by COTS competitor T/Space's CXV capsule. The capsule design shape had a spherical nose section diameter of 0.8 of the base diameter and 10 degree conical half-angle (see Atmospheric reentry).

==== Capsule layout ====
The capsule consisted of two structures - an outer aeroshell, which supported the ablative heatshield (thermal protection system), and an inner pressurized cylinder containing the crew, systems, and cargo space.

Most of the spacecraft systems were at the front of the cylinder, up against the front bulkhead. The crew were seated in one row near the rear bulkhead and access hatch, with 2 "crew" seats on the sides with flight controls on the rear bulkhead and one passenger in the middle. Cargo was carried in the middle of the capsule, at the capsule's center of gravity, to simplify loading effects on reentry angles and lift.

=== Descent and landing ===
The S-550 capsule was intended to descend under a parachute system and touch down on land, using an inert aluminum foam crush structure in the nose of the capsule to attenuate the roughly 7 meter per second touchdown velocity. The landing did not require any active controls or systems to operate safely. Emergency landings in the water were handled by capsule flotation systems.

=== Service module ===
The service module was intended to provide rocket thrusters to control spacecraft attitude and provide orbital maneuvering capability to rendezvous with the International Space Station and then reenter the Earth's atmosphere. It included some structure, propellant tanks, and rocket motor systems.
