= SpaceX COTS Demo Flight 2 =

2012 American test spaceflight to the ISS

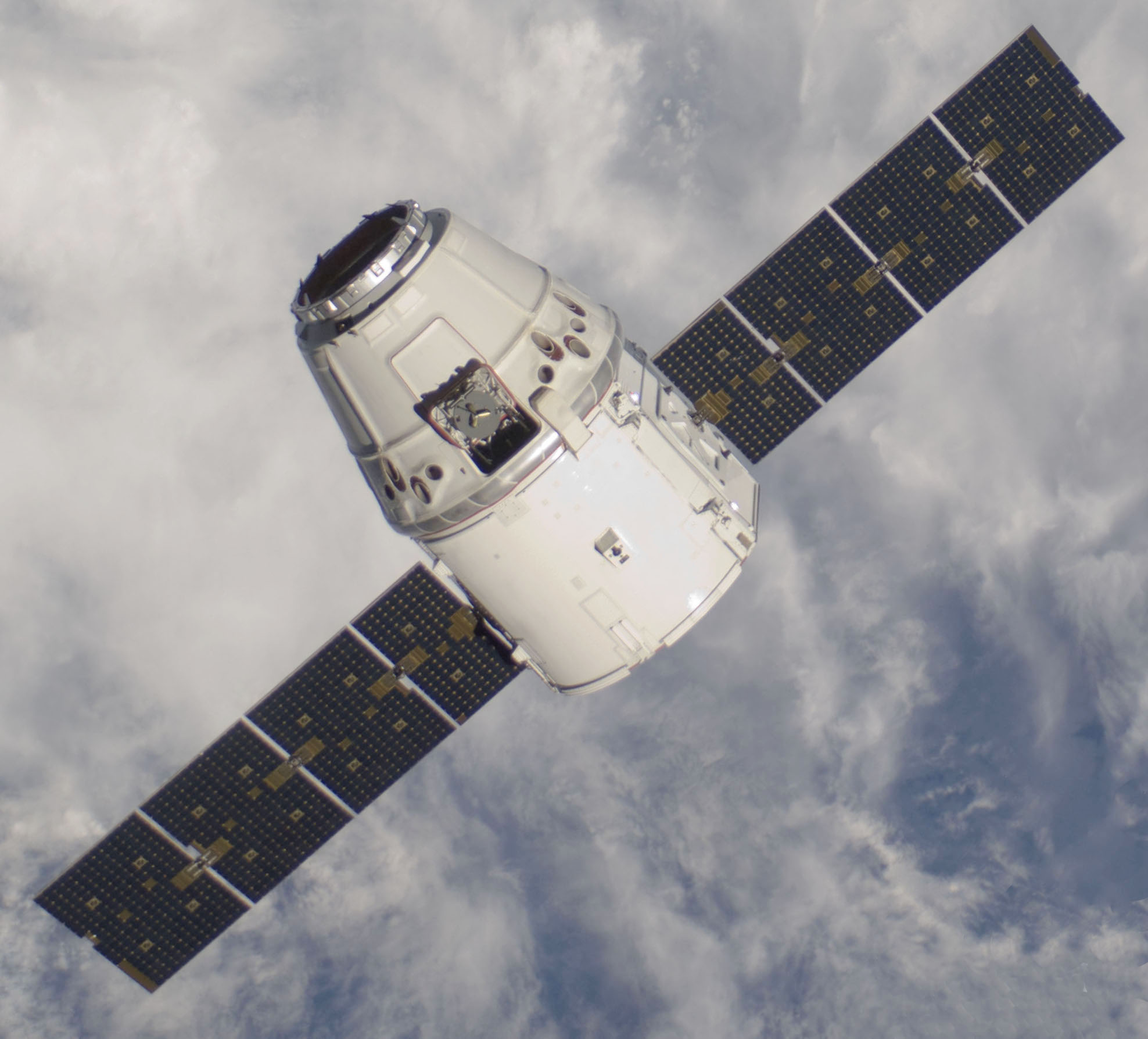
- Dragon 1 C102 approaching ISS on 25 May 2012
- Names: COTS 2; Dragon C2+
- Mission type: ISS resupply
- Operator: SpaceX
- COSPAR ID: 2012-027A
- SATCAT no.: 38348
- Mission duration: 9 days, 7 hours, 57 minutes

Spacecraft properties
- Spacecraft: Dragon 1 C102
- Spacecraft type: Dragon 1
- Manufacturer: SpaceX

Start of mission
- Launch date: 22 May 2012, 07:44:38 UTC
- Rocket: Falcon 9 v1.0 (B0005)
- Launch site: Cape Canaveral, SLC‑40

End of mission
- Disposal: Recovered
- Landing date: 31 May 2012, 15:42 UTC
- Landing site: 26°55′12″N 120°42′00″W

Orbital parameters
- Reference system: Geocentric
- Regime: Low Earth
- Inclination: 51.6°

Berthing at ISS
- Berthing port: Harmony nadir
- Berthing date: 25 May 2012, 16:02 UTC
- Unberthing date: 31 May 2012, 08:07 UTC
- RMS release: 31 May 2012, 09:49 UTC
- Time berthed: 5 days 16 hours 5 minutes
- Commercial Orbital Transportation Services Cargo Dragon

SpaceX COTS Demo Flight 2 (COTS 2), also known as Dragon C2+, was the second test-flight for SpaceX's uncrewed Cargo Dragon spacecraft. It launched in May 2012 on the third flight of the company's two-stage Falcon 9 launch vehicle. The flight was performed under a funded agreement from NASA as the second Dragon demonstration mission in the Commercial Orbital Transportation Services (COTS) program. The purpose of the COTS program is to develop and demonstrate commercial sources for cargo re-supply of the International Space Station (ISS). The Dragon C2+ spacecraft was the first American vehicle to visit the ISS since the end of the Space Shuttle program. It was also the first commercial spacecraft to rendezvous and berth with another spacecraft.

Initially, the objectives of the C2+ mission were to have been accomplished by two separate missions; Dragon C2 would have carried out a fly-by of the ISS, practiced rendezvous maneuvers and communications with the station, before returning to Earth. A second mission, Dragon C3, would have been the first mission to berth with the station. In July 2011, NASA gave tentative approval to combine the objectives of the two missions. In December 2011, NASA formally approved the merger of the COTS 2 and 3 missions into the Dragon C2+ flight. There were several launch delays, the last one occurring on 19 May 2012, due to a launch abort during the last second before liftoff.

Dragon C2+ successfully launched from Cape Canaveral on 22 May 2012. During the mission's first three days all of the COTS 2 objectives were successfully completed. The mission's COTS 3 phase began on 25 May when Dragon rendezvoused again with the ISS and then was successfully captured using the Canadarm2. It was berthed to the station later that day, using the robotic arm. Dragon stayed for almost six days during which the astronauts unloaded cargo, and then reloaded Dragon with Earth-bound cargo. On 31 May, Dragon unberthed from the ISS, its capsule landed in the Pacific Ocean off the California coast and was recovered. All the objectives of the mission were successfully completed, and the Falcon 9-Dragon system became certified to start regular cargo delivery missions to the ISS under the Commercial Resupply Services program.

== History ==
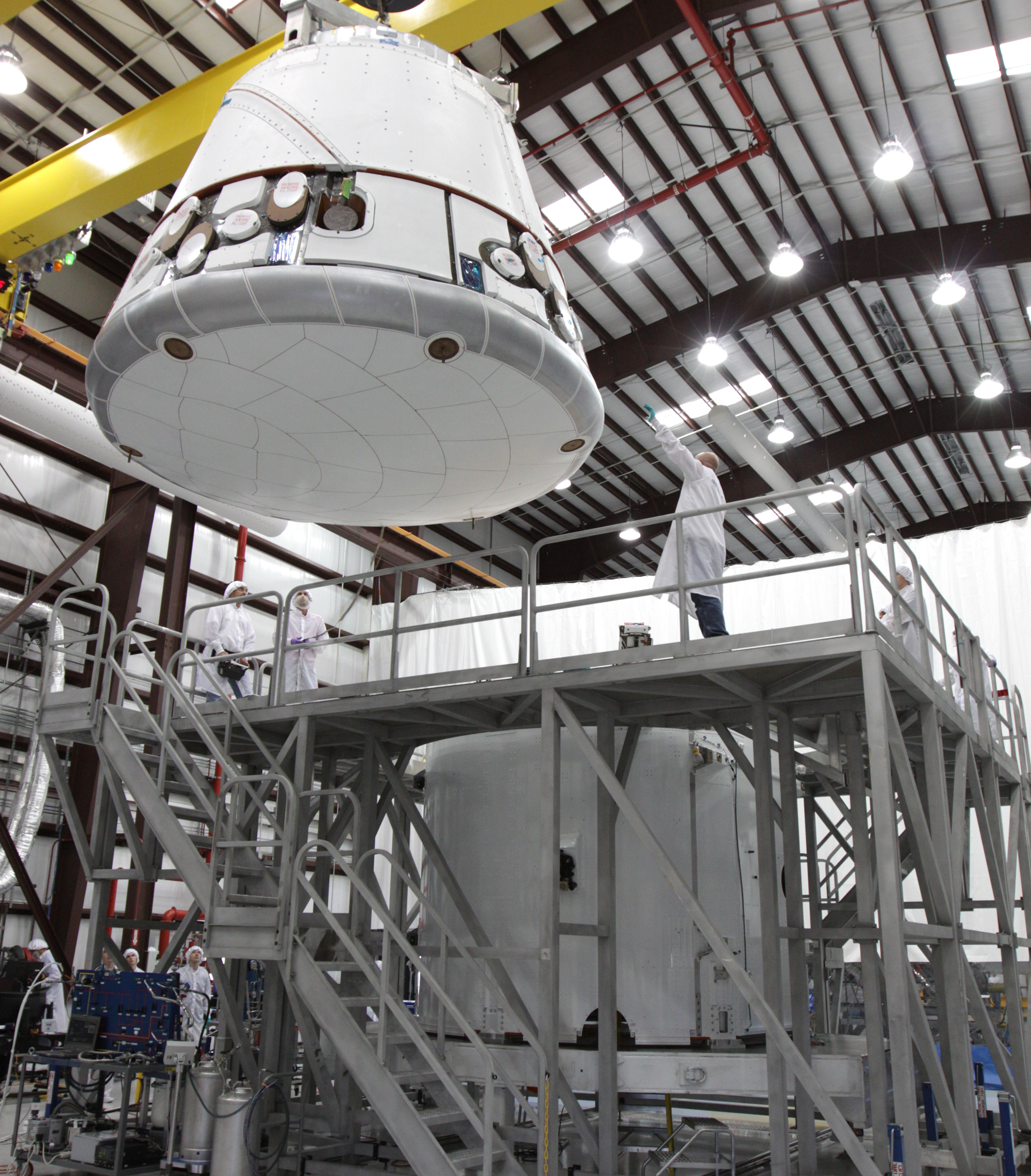
Dragon C102 capsule being lowered onto its trunk at LC-40 on 16 November 2011 during pre-launch processing.

NASA and SpaceX signed a contract for COTS cargo resupply services on 18 August 2006. The agreement called for three test-flights, under the COTS phase 1 demonstration program. The first COTS mission, COTS Demo Flight 1, was completed successfully on 8 December 2010, when the Dragon capsule was successfully recovered from orbit, making it the first commercially built and operated spacecraft to ever do so. Due to the mission's success, SpaceX asked NASA to combine the COTS 2 ISS flyby flight, which would have seen a Dragon spacecraft approach the station but stay about 10 km away from it, and the COTS 3 flight that would berth with the ISS. At a 15 July 2011 meeting, NASA tentatively approved combining the two COTS missions to accelerate the program into the operational supply mission phase in 2012. On 9 December, NASA officially approved the merger of the COTS 2 and 3 missions into the renamed Dragon C2+ flight.

The Falcon 9 launch vehicle arrived at SpaceX's Cape Canaveral, Florida facilities at Launch Complex 40 (LC-40) in July 2011. The mission's Dragon spacecraft arrived at the launch site on 23 October 2011. On 1 March 2012, a fueled countdown test called a Wet Dress Rehearsal (WDR), was successfully completed for the COTS 2 mission. On 16 April its Flight Readiness Review (FRR) was completed by NASA and stated that a 30 April launch was feasible. Following the review SpaceX announced a launch delay due to continued flight software testing issues, and the next major mission milestone was the successful Falcon 9 static-fire engine test on 30 April. NASA approved Dragon's flight software on 11 May, solving an issue that had previously been responsible for several launch date postponements. On 17 May, the mission passed its final launch review and the Falcon 9/Dragon were erected on the launch pad in preparation for the launch. The first launch attempt, on 19 May, was aborted at T-00:00:00.5 due to a pressure issue in one of the Falcon 9's engines. The launch window was nearly instantaneous, for fuel-efficiency reasons, leaving little margin for error due to fuel consumption restrictions caused by the extra manoeuvres required to certify the Dragon spaceship before attempting to berth with the ISS. Dragon's launch window could have been longer, but the extra fuel required to catch the ISS would have likely surpassed safety margins, due to the pre-berthing tests.

=== Original plan ===
Under the original Dragon testing plan, the C2 and C3 missions would have been flown instead of C2+. C2 would have rendezvoused with the ISS, however it would not have performed the capture and berthing part of the mission. The third test-flight was intended to be Dragon's first mission to berth with the ISS. Following a 15 July 2011 meeting between SpaceX and NASA officials, the COTS 3 mission objectives were tentatively combined with the proposed COTS 2 demonstration flight, due to the Falcon 9's two previously successful launches, and the Space Shuttle fleet recently being retired.

On 9 December 2011, NASA formally approved the two missions' merger, and set the initial launch date for 7 February 2012. Several delays occurred between December and May 2012, mostly due to SpaceX needing to further test hardware and software. The Dragon C2+ mission successfully launched on 22 May, from Cape Canaveral Launch Complex 40 (SLC‑40). It successfully completed all COTS 2 mission objectives, then berthed with the ISS, and completed all COTS 3 mission objectives, before successfully splashing down in the Pacific Ocean, off the California coast on 31 May. Since all COTS objectives were met during the Dragon C2+ flight in May 2012, the need for COTS Demo Flight 3 was eliminated.

== Mission timeline ==
=== Flight day 1, launch (22 May) ===
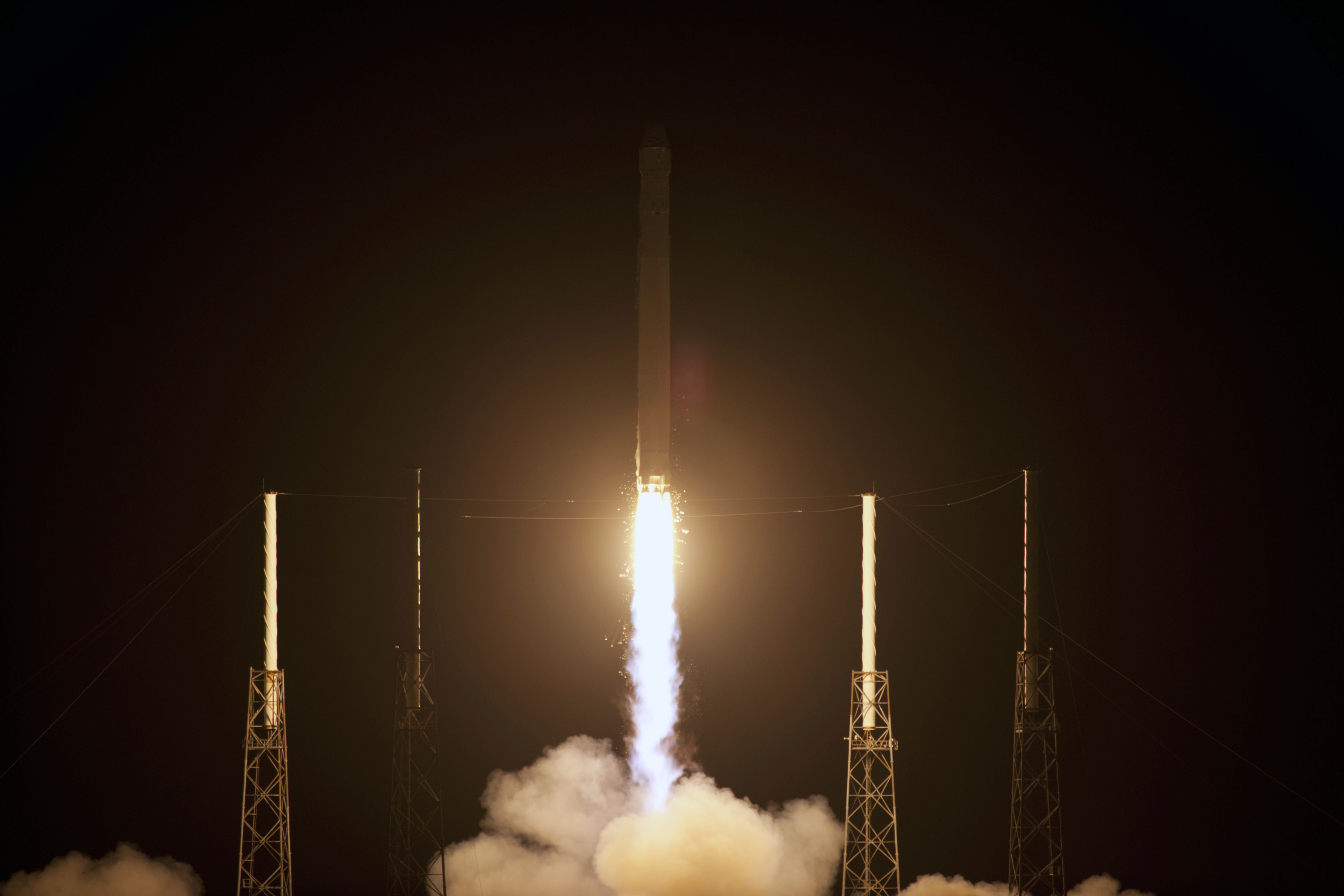
The COTS 2 Falcon 9 successfully launches with the Dragon spacecraft on 22 May 2012.

Launch occurred at 03:44 EDT (07:44 UTC) on 22 May 2012. This was the first time a Falcon 9 was launched at night. After lift-off, main engine shut-off occurred at approximately the 180-second mark, and the first stage began to be separated. Following stage separation, the second stage ignited. The Dragon's nose cone was then jettisoned. And at about nine minutes into the flight, the second-stage engine shut-off occurred and separated from the Dragon spacecraft. The Dragon spacecraft successfully deployed its solar arrays at about 13 minutes into the flight.

The initial COTS 2 tests began during this flight segment, when Dragon performed a test of its Absolute GPS (AGPS) system, using global positioning system satellites to determine its location. Next, Dragon opened its bay door which housed its grapple fixture and relative navigation sensors, a thermal imager and the LIDAR based DragonEye. After a checkout of these sensors was completed, Dragon demonstrated its ability to abort during an approach, first with a continuous firing of its Draco engines and then with a pulsed firing. A free drift demonstration then began, allowing the spacecraft to float freely without using its thrusters which would normally correct its orbital path.

=== Flight day 2 (23 May) ===
On flight day two, Dragon began a series of thruster burns, called "height adjustment" burn (HA-1), and "co-elliptical" burn (CE-1). (Note: A height adjustment burn is a thruster burn that changes the Dragon spacecraft's altitude, while the co-elliptical burn changes its shape. "Coelliptic orbits can be defined as two orbits that are coplanar and confocal. A property of coelliptic orbits is that the difference in magnitude between aligned radius vectors is nearly the same, regardless of where within the orbits they are positioned. For this and other reasons, coelliptic orbits are useful in rendezvous".) The CE-1 burn changed Dragon's orbit characteristics by placing it into a circular orbit around the Earth. The HA-1 burn raised Dragon's altitude to within a few kilometres below the ISS, in preparation for the next day's rendezvous demonstration.

=== Flight day 3 (24 May) ===
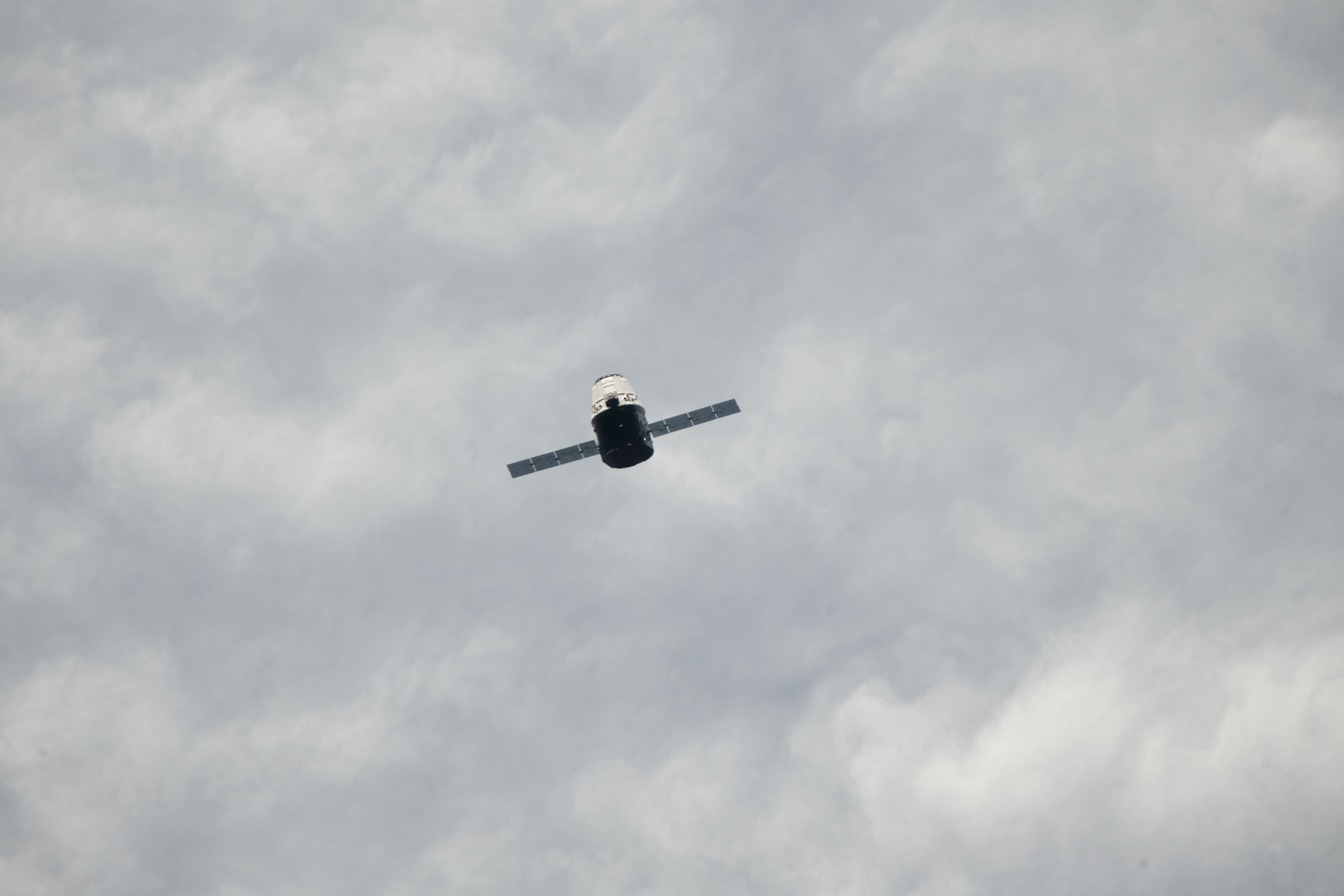
Dragon spacecraft seen from the ISS during the fly-under on day three, 24 May 2012.

On flight day three, Dragon performed height adjustment burn 2 (HA-2) at 07:58 UTC, to get within about 10 km (6.2 mi) of the ISS, the "communication zone." At 08:43 UTC co-elliptical burn 2 (CE-2) raised its orbit to nearly the same plane as the ISS, and brought it to within 2,500 m (8,200 ft) below the station. During this "fly-under," Dragon established communications with the station using its COTS Ultra-high frequency Communication Unit (CUCU). Dragon performed a test of its Relative GPS (RGPS) system, which used the relative positions of the spacecraft to the space station to determine its location. Also, using the Crew Command Panel (CCP) on board the Cupola module, the Expedition 31 crew briefly interacted with Dragon, monitoring the fly-under and just before 11:00 UTC sending a command to Dragon to turn on its strobe light. At about 11:25 UTC the Dragon made its closest approach to the ISS. Once the fly-under was completed, Dragon fired its thrusters to begin a loop out in front, above and then behind the station in a racetrack oval pattern at a distance between 7 and 10 km (4.3 and 6.2 mi). The Dragon performed a final burn for the day, at 11:57 UTC, that moved it away from the ISS, and set the spacecraft up for a re-rendezvous with the station the next day. After Dragon cleared the station's vicinity, NASA approved the berthing to occur on day 4, meaning all the original COTS 2 mission requirements were met.

=== Flight day 4 (25 May) ===
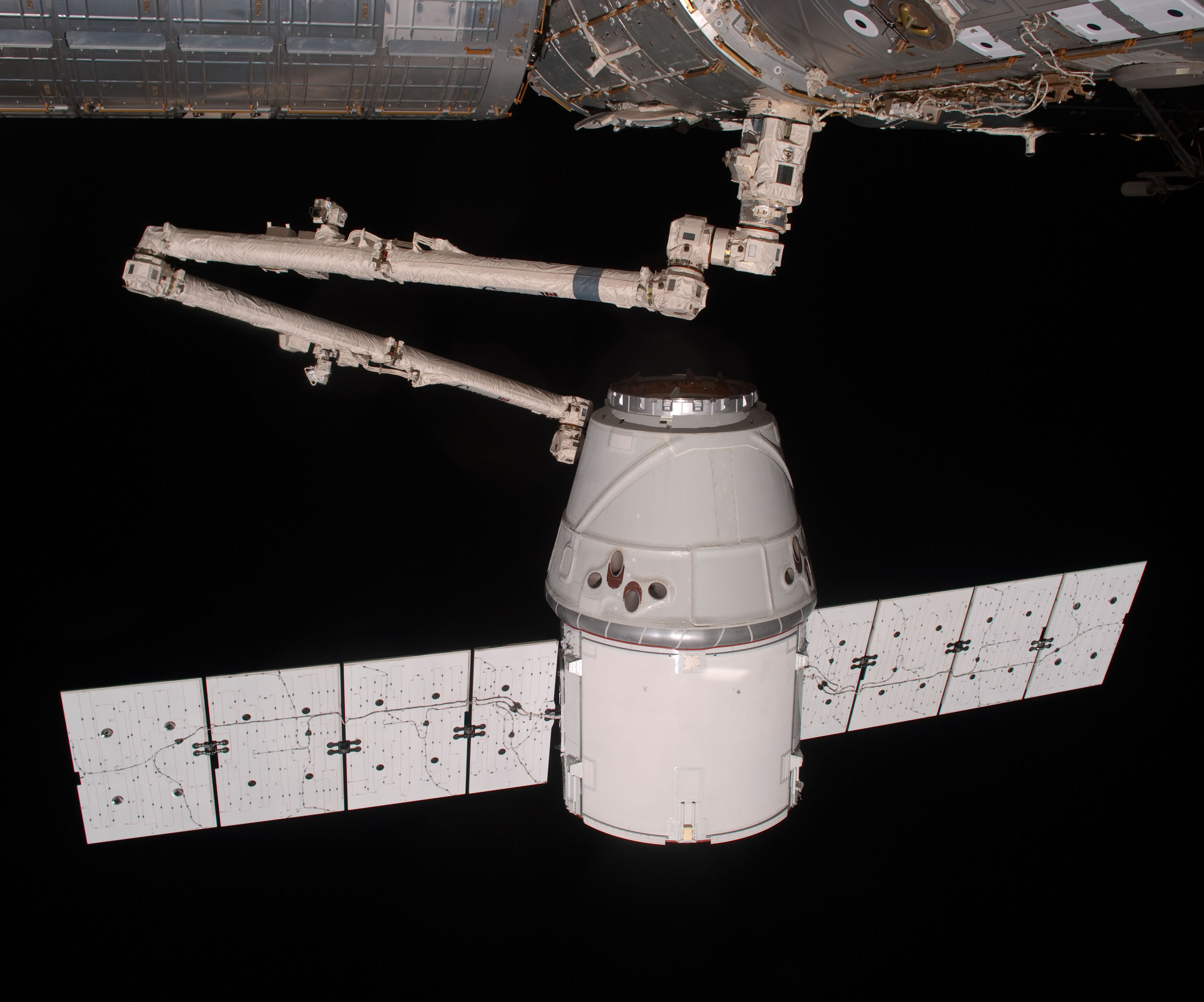
The Dragon spacecraft being berthed to the International Space Station on day four, 25 May 2012.

On flight day four, Dragon performed HA-3 and CE-3 thruster burns to bring it 2.5 km (1.6 mi) below the station once again. NASA's Mission Control Houston team then gave SpaceX the go ahead to perform another set of burns that brought Dragon to within 1,400 m (4,600 ft) of the station. Another decision was made at Mission Control Houston, and then Dragon moved to 250 m (820 ft) from the station. At this point, the COTS 3 demonstration objectives began. Dragon's DragonEye system demonstrated and confirmed that its position and velocity were accurate by comparing its LIDAR image to its thermal imagers. A series of checkout maneuvers commenced. The SpaceX flight control team in Hawthorne, California, commanded the spacecraft to approach the station from its hold position. It moved from 250 to 220 m (820 to 720 ft) below the station. The crew, using the command panel, then instructed Dragon to retreat, and the spacecraft moved back down to the hold point. This test ensured that Dragon's range to the ISS was accurate, and that the flight control team saw the spacecraft's acceleration and braking perform as expected. It was in a holding pattern at 250 m (820 ft), and once again the Dragon flight team commanded it to approach the station. At the 220 m (720 ft) position, the crew commanded the vehicle to hold.

Another decision was made in Houston, and Dragon was permitted to enter the Keep-Out Sphere (KOS), a virtual area 200 m (660 ft) around the station intended to prevent collision with the orbiting complex. Two additional and non-planned holds occurred: one at 150 m (490 ft) to further verify LIDAR; and finally one by SpaceX at 70 m (230 ft) to re-configure the LIDARs. Stray reflections from the JAXA JEM module's External Facility (EF) caused interference with the LIDAR; SpaceX decided to narrow the LIDAR's field-of-view to eliminate the reflections.

Dragon proceeded to a position 30 m (98 ft) from the station and automatically came to a stop for a hold. Another decision was made, and then Dragon proceeded to the capture point position at 9 m (30 ft). A final decision was made, and the Mission Control Houston team notified the crew they were go to capture Dragon. At that point, from the Cupola module, Expedition 31 crew member Don Pettit used the station's Mobile Servicing System (Canadarm2) to reach out and grapple the Dragon spacecraft at 13:56 UTC over Western Australia. Upon capture, Pettit jokingly told ISS CAPCOM Megan McArthur, "Looks like we got us a Dragon by the tail. We're thinking this sim went really well, we're ready to turn it around and do it for real." Pettit, with the help of fellow crewmember André Kuipers, guided and then berthed Dragon to the Harmony module's Earth-facing Common Berthing Mechanism at 16:02 UTC.

=== Flight day 5 and remainder of mission (26 to 31 May) ===
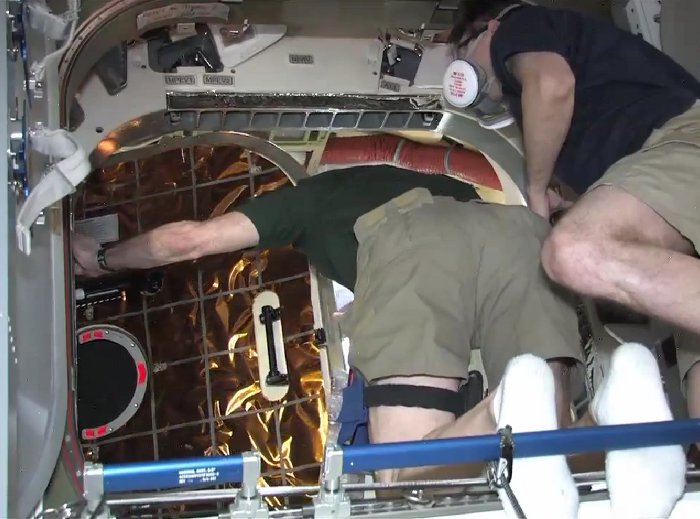
Don Pettit opening Dragon's hatch on 26 May.

On flight day five, after evaluating air quality inside Dragon, the crew opened the hatch between Dragon and the station at 05:53 EDT (09:53 UTC). Pettit and Russian cosmonaut and station commander Oleg Kononenko were the first crew members to enter the Dragon. They wore protective goggles and breathing masks as they performed further tests to make sure the atmosphere inside the capsule was safe, which it was, though Pettit noted that "the inside smells like a brand new car."

Dragon spent approximately six days berthed to the space station, allowing astronauts time to unload its cargo. They then reloaded it with Earth-bound cargo. On 27 May, while being controlled by Mission Control Houston, Dextre was used to survey Dragon's trunk.

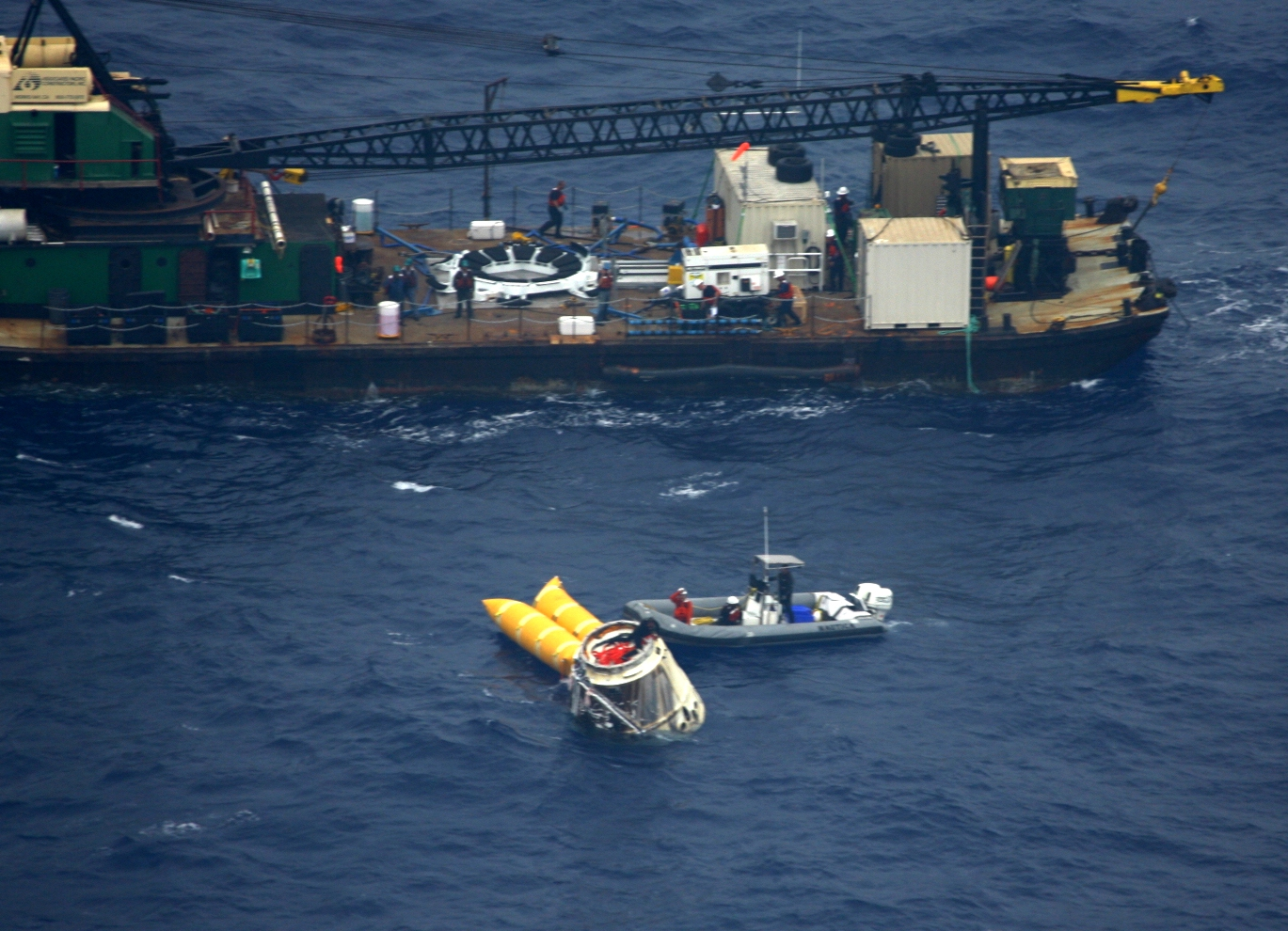
Recovery of the COTS 2 Dragon on 31 May.

On its final day at the station, 31 May, the crew unberthed Dragon from Harmony using the Canadarm2 at 05:49 EDT (09:49 UTC). The arm moved Dragon about 10 m (33 ft) away from the station and released it. Dragon then performed a series of engine burns that placed it on a trajectory to take it away from the vicinity of the station. Mission Control Houston then confirmed that Dragon was on a safe path away from the complex. SpaceX instructed Dragon to close its bay door and approximately four hours after Dragon left the station, it began to conduct its nine-minute-long deorbit burn. The Dragon capsule jettisoned its trunk and began to re-enter the Earth's atmosphere. Its heatshield protected it during most of the re-entry and when low enough in altitude its two drogue parachutes were deployed, followed by its three main parachutes. The Dragon capsule splashed down into the Pacific Ocean about 900 km (560 mi) from the Baja Peninsula at approximately 11:42 EDT (15:42 UTC) and was recovered by a small fleet of recovery vessels from the contractor hired by SpaceX, American Marine.

=== Capsule journey post-mission ===
On 5 June, the Dragon capsule arrived at the Port of Los Angeles and was transported by truck to McGregor, Texas. There its toxic maneuvering propellent was removed and on 13 June its cargo was transferred into NASA's possession. The cargo was then transported to the Johnson Space Center in Houston for further processing. On 18 July 2012, the COTS 2 Dragon was temporarily displayed to an invited audience inside a tent, in front of the Historical Society of Washington, D.C. building. On 7 September 2012, Steve Jurvetson, a member on the board of directors at SpaceX, reported that the C2+ capsule was undergoing post-flight analysis back in McGregor. Later in 2012 the Dragon capsule was expected to be transported back to Hawthorne, California. During the post-flight press conference, the CEO and CTO of SpaceX Elon Musk stated that there are no definitive plans for the capsule but that he would like to see it taken on a tour around the United States. The capsule was displayed at the 2013 Electronic Entertainment Expo in Los Angeles, California from 11 to 13 June. The historic Dragon C2+ capsule was ultimately placed on permanent display hanging from the ceiling at SpaceX headquarters.

On 23 August 2012, NASA announced that SpaceX and their Falcon 9-Dragon system was certified to begin their cargo delivery contract. The $1.6 billion contract calls for at least 12 resupply missions. The first of those flights was launched on 7 October 2012.

== Payload ==
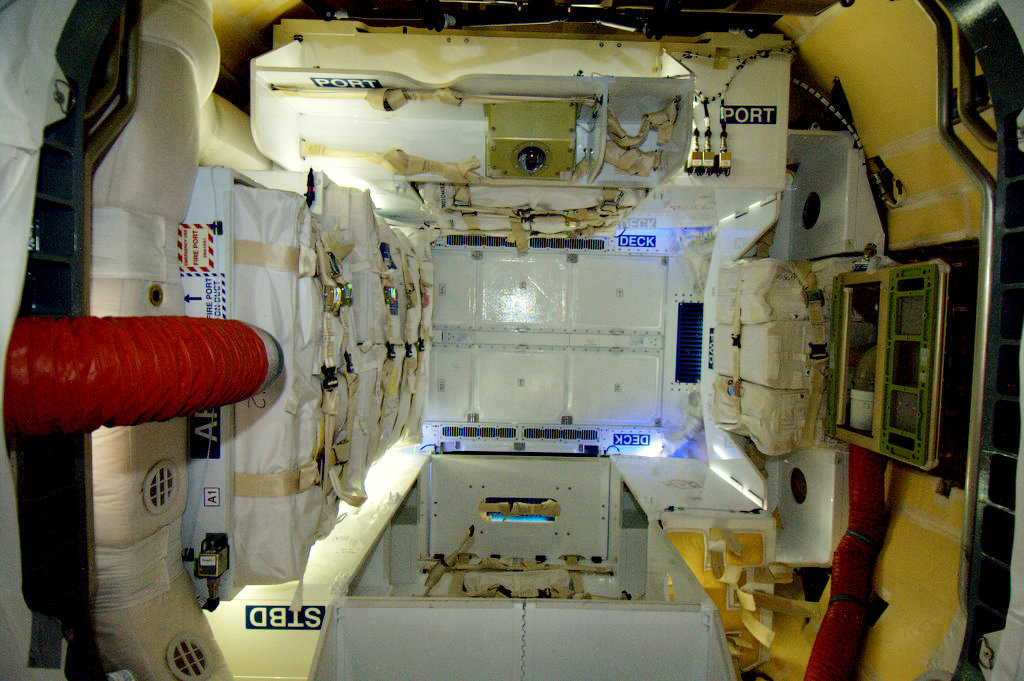
The interior of the Dragon spacecraft on 26 May, showing some of the delivered cargo.

The pressurized section carried 525 kg (1,157 lb) of cargo to the ISS, which included food, water, clothing, cargo bags, computer hardware, the NanoRacks Module 9 (student experiments and scientific gear) and other miscellaneous cargo. No unpressurized cargo was delivered on this mission.

An unannounced addition to the cargo manifest, made public after the launch, was a small canister, affixed to the second stage's top, containing the 1-gram ash remains of over 300 people including Project Mercury Astronaut Gordon Cooper, and James Doohan, the actor who played Scotty on the television show Star Trek in the 1960s. The remains were flown semi-secretly by Celestis, a company that has flown burial canisters in the past on SpaceX's Falcon 1 launch vehicle. The second stage and the burial canister remained in the initial orbit Dragon C2+ was inserted to, and burned up in the Earth's atmosphere a month later.

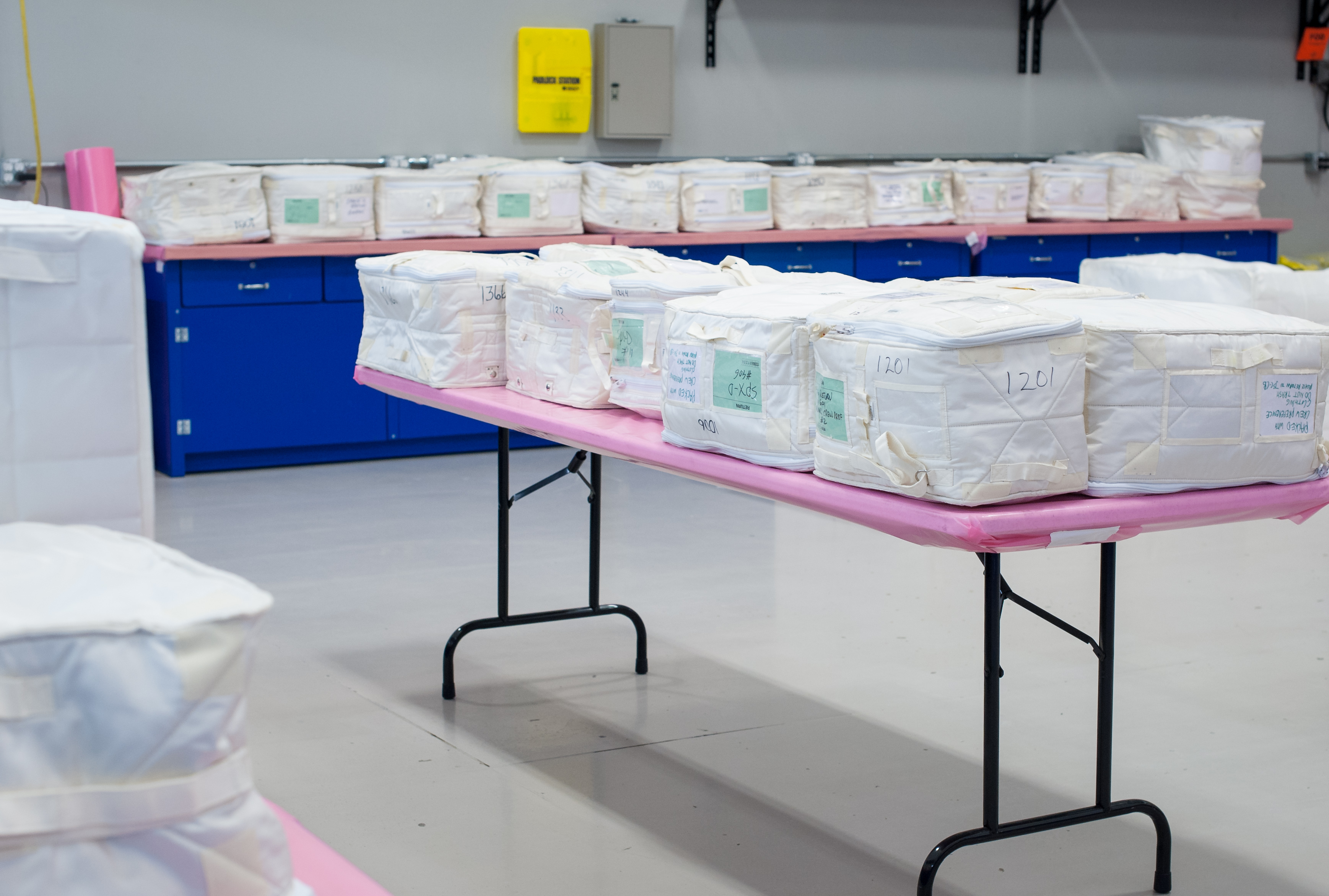
Some of the returned cargo is seen in McGregor, Texas on 13 June 2012.

On its return to Earth, Dragon brought back 665 kg (1,466 lb) worth of pressurized cargo back to Earth; the cargo included experiment samples, experiment hardware, ISS' systems hardware and Extravehicular Mobility Unit hardware. One of the experiments returned by Dragon was the Shear History Extensional Rheology Experiment (SHERE) administered by NASA's Glenn Research Center. SHERE investigated rotational stress effects on polymer fluids. Items from SHERE included a toolbox, fluid modules, stowage trays, cables and a keyboard, and science data recordings. Another experiment returning with Dragon was the Multi-user Droplet Combustion Apparatus (MDCA), and the Combustion Integrated Rack-Fluids and Combustion Facility (CIR). The return flight was planned to carry 660 kg (1,460 lb)

Another experiment returning at the end of this mission was the Material Science Research Rack (MSRR), which investigated microgravity experiments on aluminum-alloy rods. Returning from MSRR were cartridges from thermal and vacuum investigations done on metal rods in the SETA-2 and the MSL-CETSOL and MICAST studies.

Originally, SpaceX also intended to launch two secondary payload satellites from the Dragon sometime in the first 72 hours after launch; however, on 28 December 2011, SpaceX and Orbcomm announced a revised schedule that dropped the satellite deployment from the Dragon C2+ flight plan.

== Delays ==
COTS Demo Flight 2 was to take place as early as 2010, but was delayed by internal SpaceX issues; and then in 2011 by NASA issues. As planned on the manifests, COTS 2 was to fly in June 2011. It was delayed to late 2011, and then followed by further delay by the failure of the Russian Progress 44 cargo resupply vessel in August; this incident could have forced the ISS to be temporarily abandoned in mid-November. Another delay was caused due to the berthing procedure which requires two ISS personnel to be trained and available for the procedure; in early December 2011 only one person was trained to berth the Dragon. The launch date moved as follows: 6 June 2011, 8 October 30 November and 19 December; and 7 January 2012, 30 April, and 7 May.

With a busy launch schedule at Cape Canaveral, and with other missions to the ISS, NASA and SpaceX did not announce a new date until mid-March for a 30 April launch. More testing was required by SpaceX for the computer code that controlled berthing, causing another delay to be announced on 23 April, delaying the launch to 7 May at 09:38 EDT (13:38 UTC). A further delay was announced by NASA, pushing the launch to sometime in May. On 4 May, the new targeted launch date was set for 19 May at 04:55 EDT/08:55 UTC. The launch proceeded nominally but was automatically aborted at T−00:00:00.5 when pressure in engine number 5 rose to unacceptable limits. After making repairs, the launch date was set for 22 May at 03:44 EDT (07:44 UTC), with a secondary backup date of 23 May at 03:22 EDT (07:22 UTC) if a longer delay became necessary.

== Launch attempts ==
Attempt	Planned	Result	Turnaround	Reason	Decision point	Weather go (%)	Notes
1	19 May 2012, 8:55:26 am	Abort	—	Technical	19 May 2012, 8:55 am (T−0:00:00.5)	80%	Launch was automatically aborted with higher than acceptable pressure detected in engine 5. This was due to a faulty check valve, which was then replaced later that day.
2	22 May 2012, 7:44:38 am	Success	2 days 22 hours 49 minutes			90%	Nominal launch, inserted Dragon into preliminary orbit, nine minutes and 48 seconds after launch.

== Gallery ==
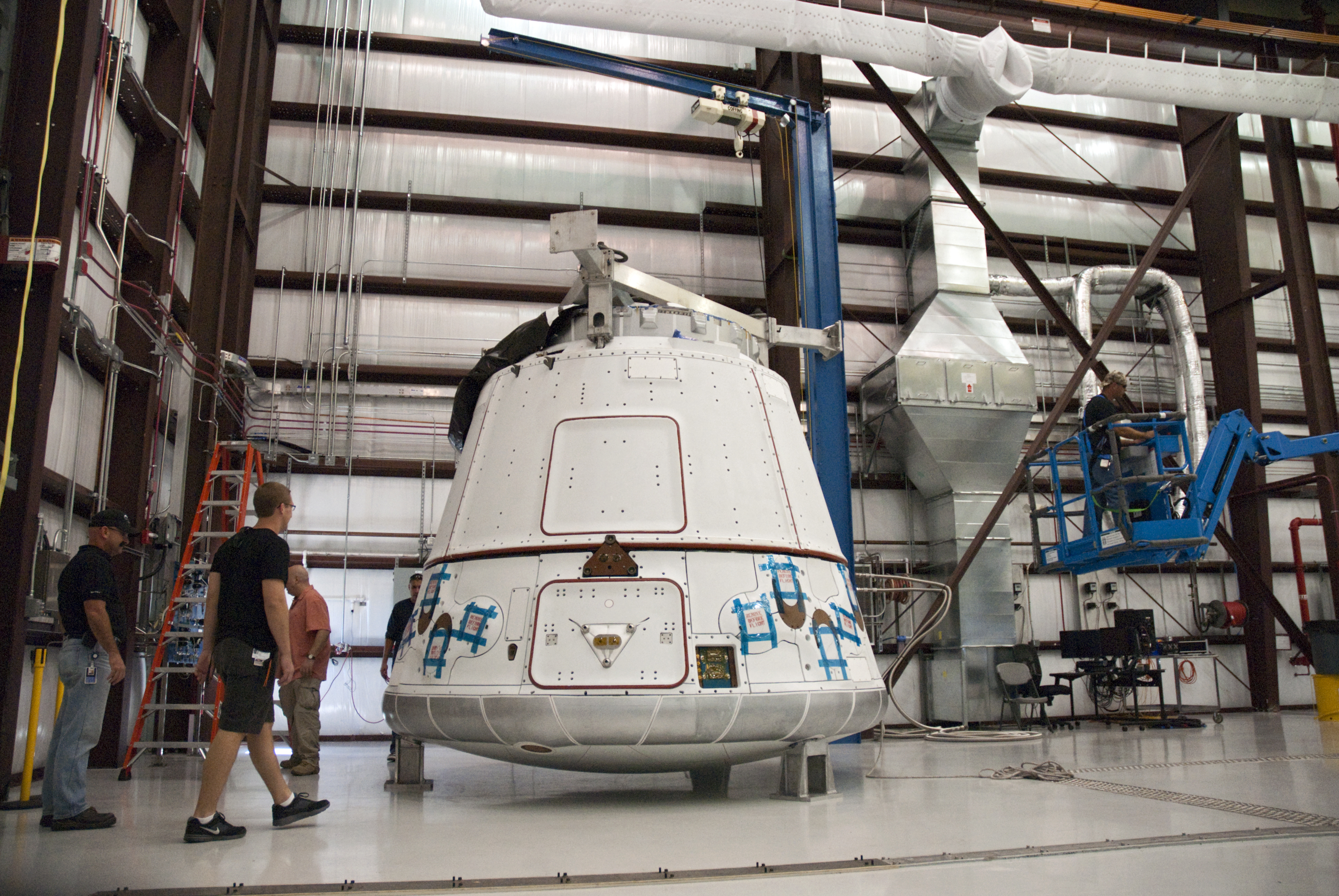
COTS 2 Dragon capsule in SpaceX hangar at LC-40 on 23 October 2011.

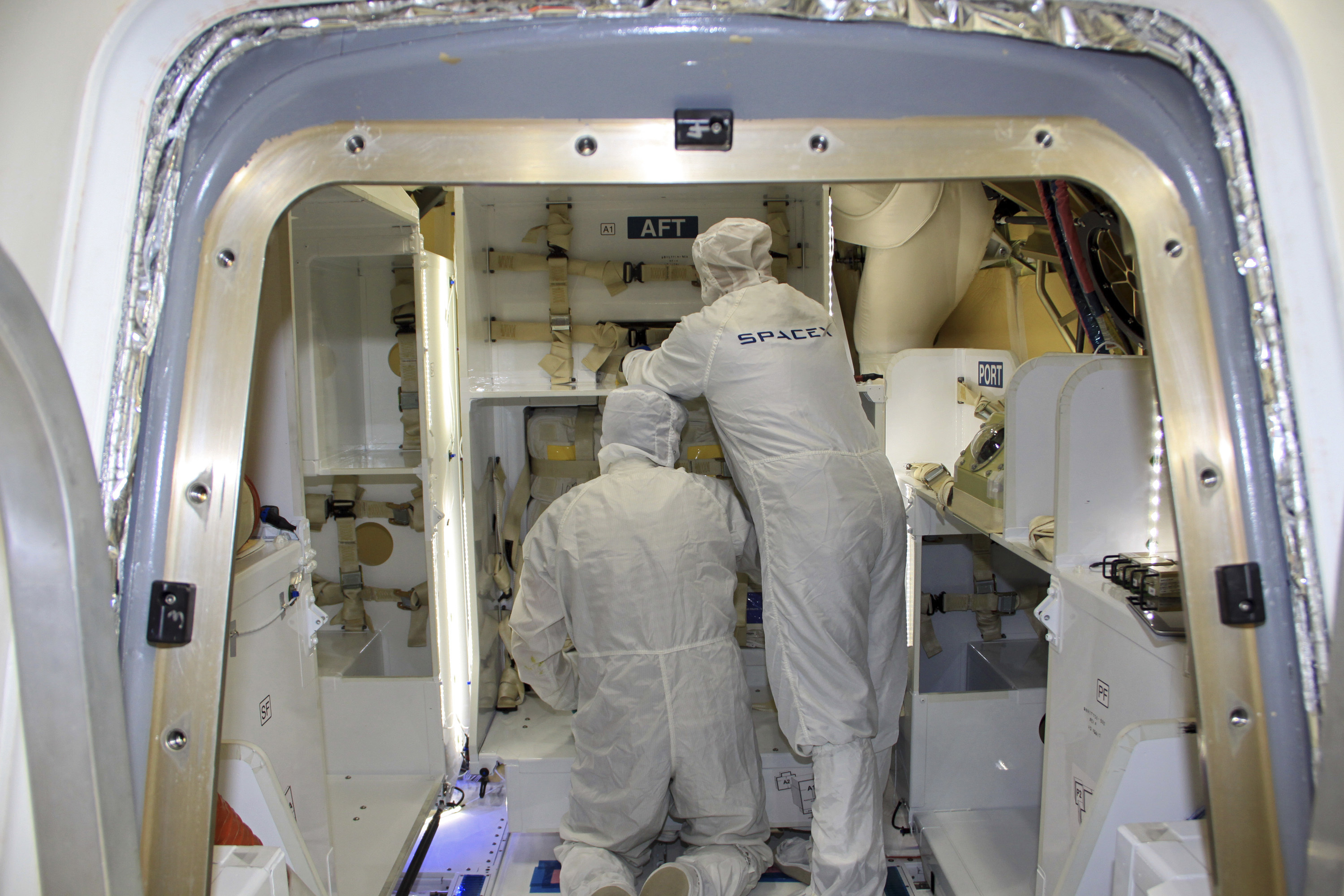
SpaceX technicians stow cargo in the COTS 2 Dragon at LC-40 on 4 April 2012.

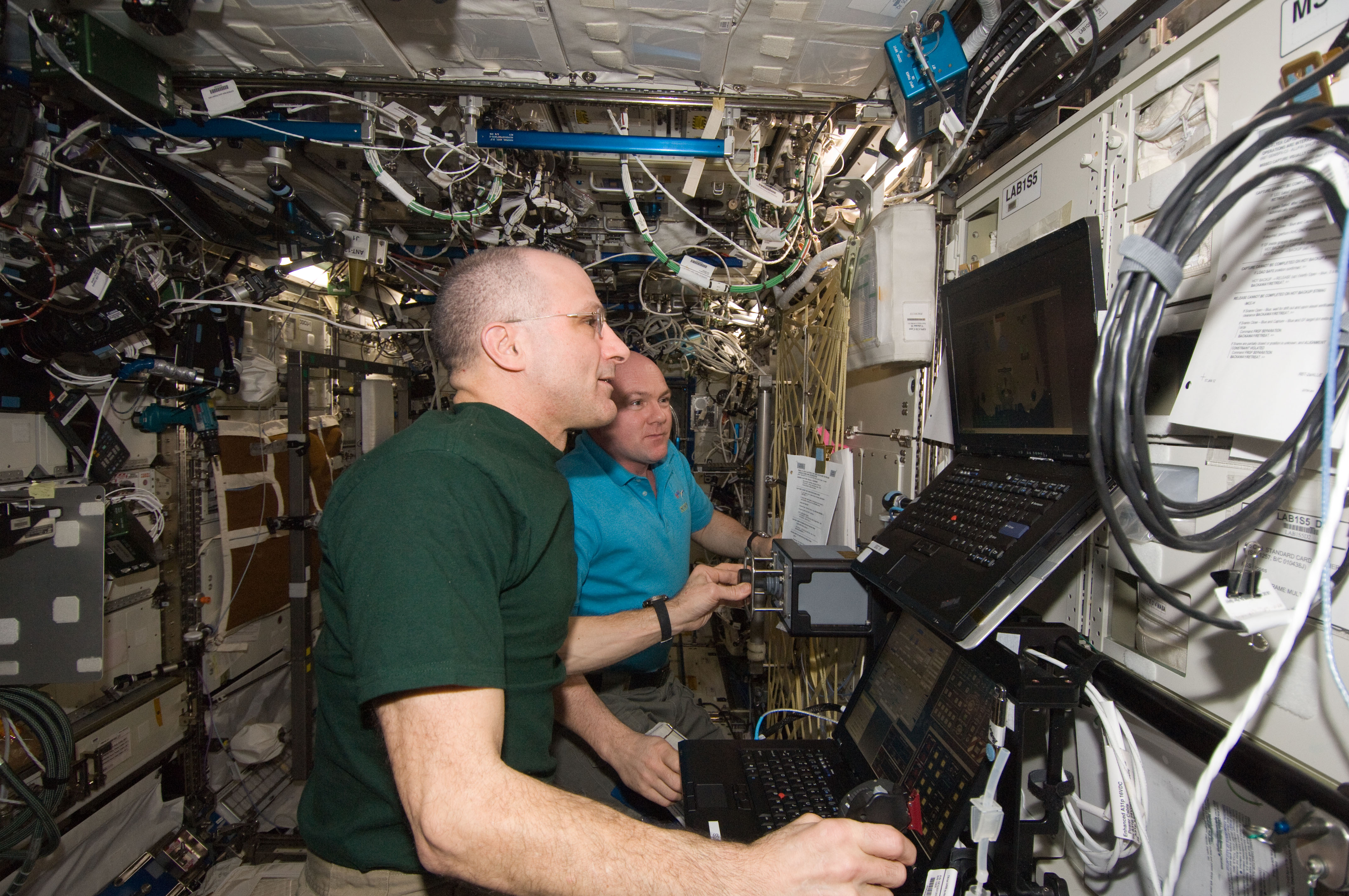
Astronauts Donald Pettit (foreground) and André Kuipers practice grappling Dragon in a simulation aboard the ISS on 11 April 2012.

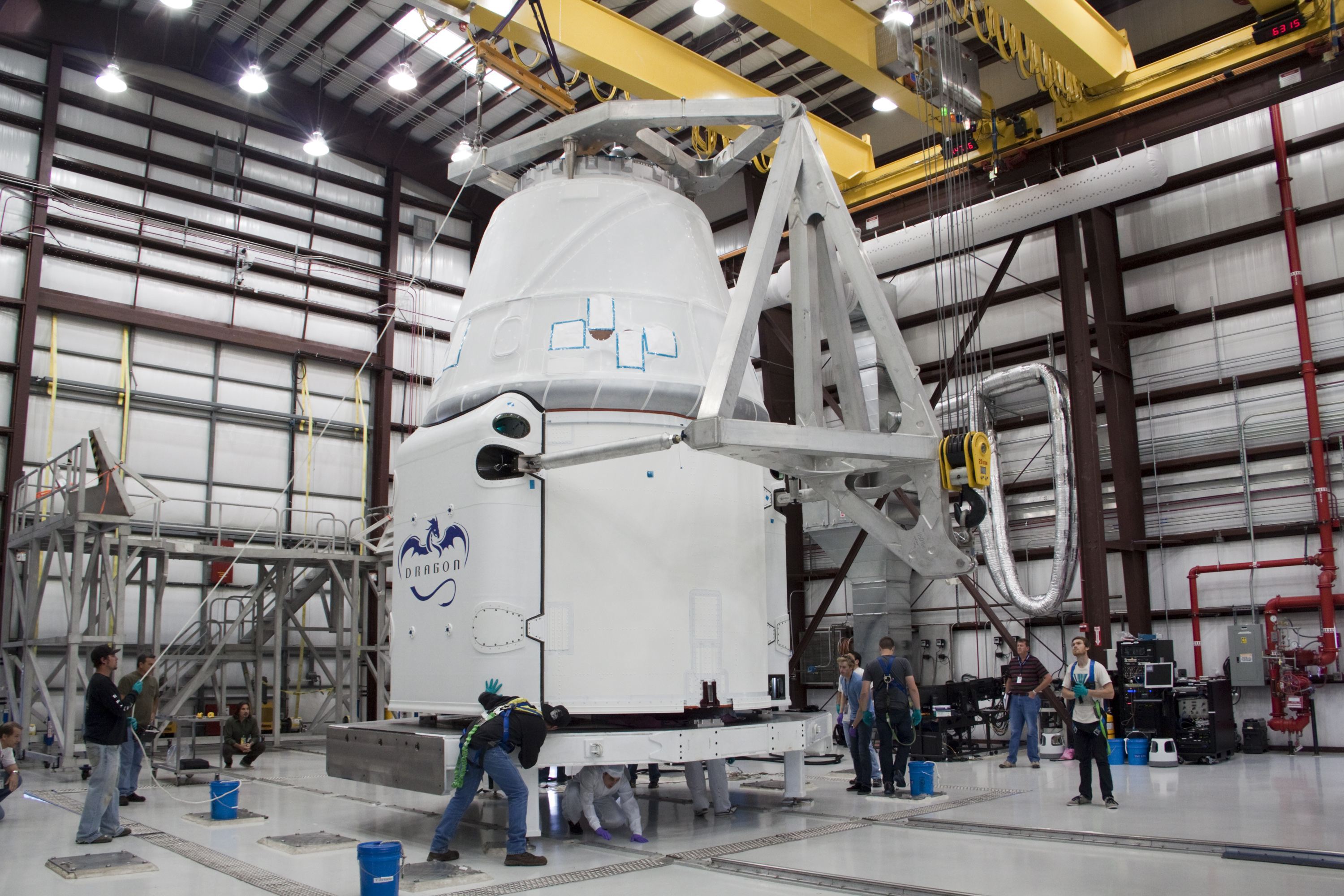
Dragon with trunk pontoons installed on 26 April 2012.

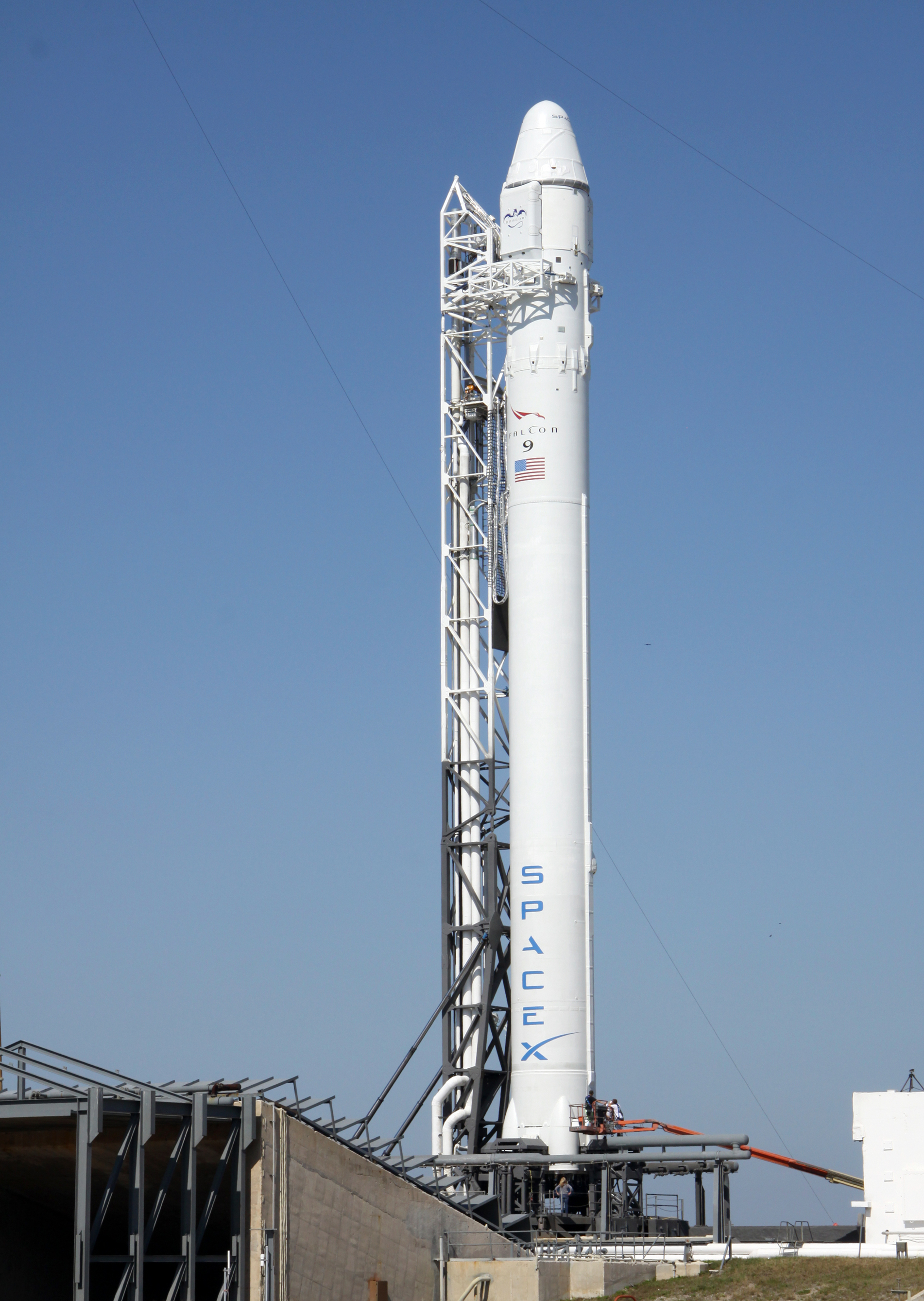
The Falcon 9/Dragon vertical at launch pad on 18 May 2012 in preparation for the launch.

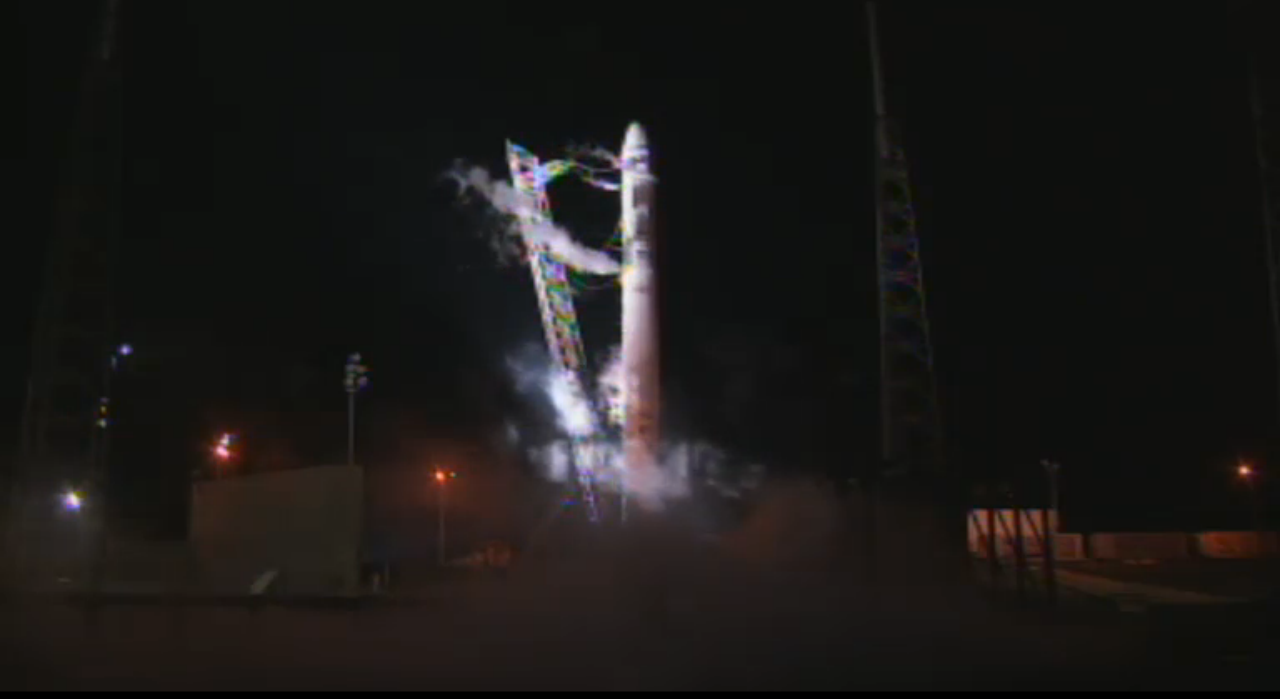
At launch pad around 05:00 EST on 19 May 2012 (five minutes after automated abort). Strongback is being reapplied.

Falcon 9, Flight 3, launch on 22 May 2012 (video).

Dragon C2+, flight day four, berthing with the ISS on 25 May 2012.

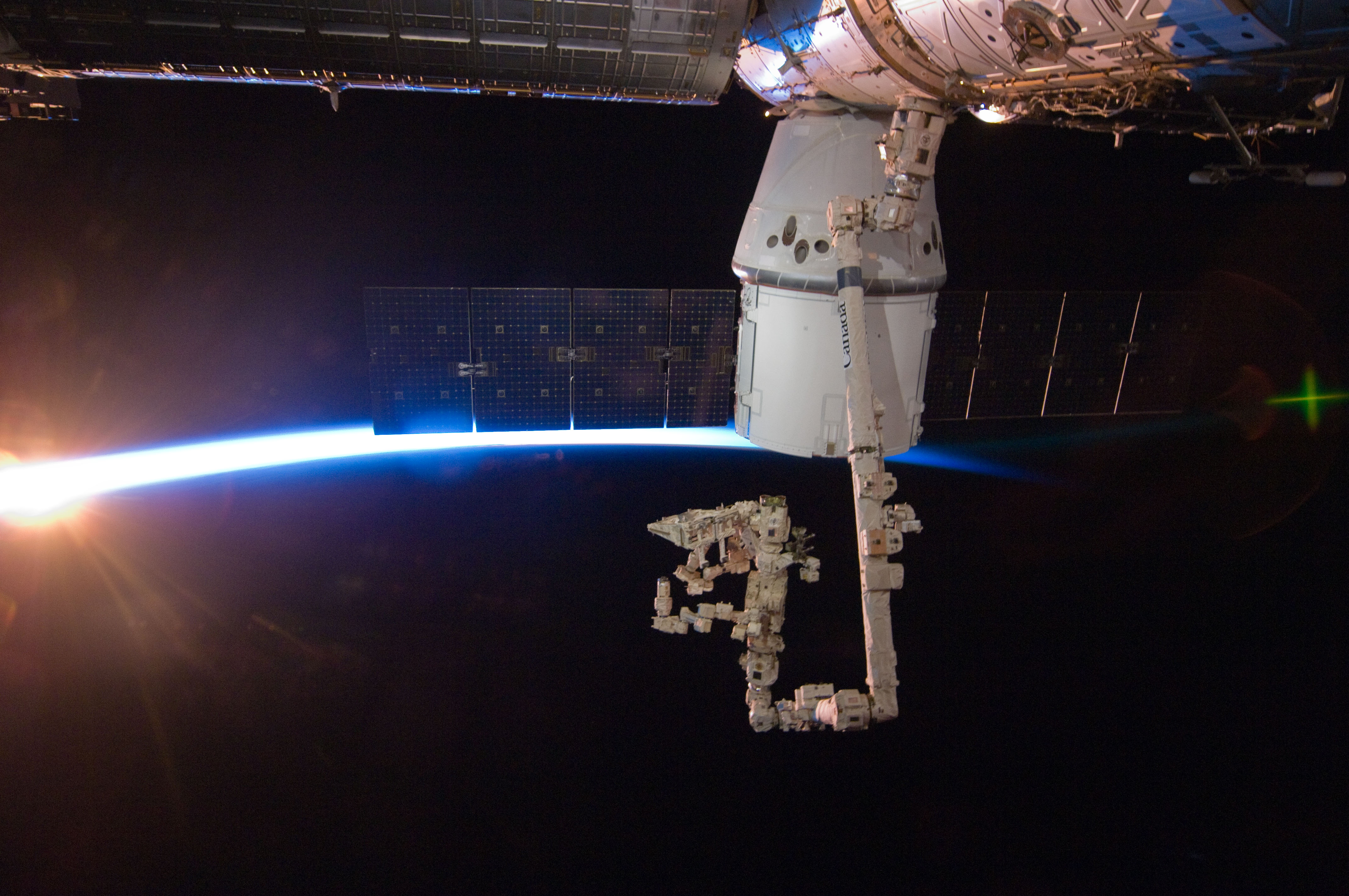
Dextre inspecting Dragon's trunk on 27 May 2012

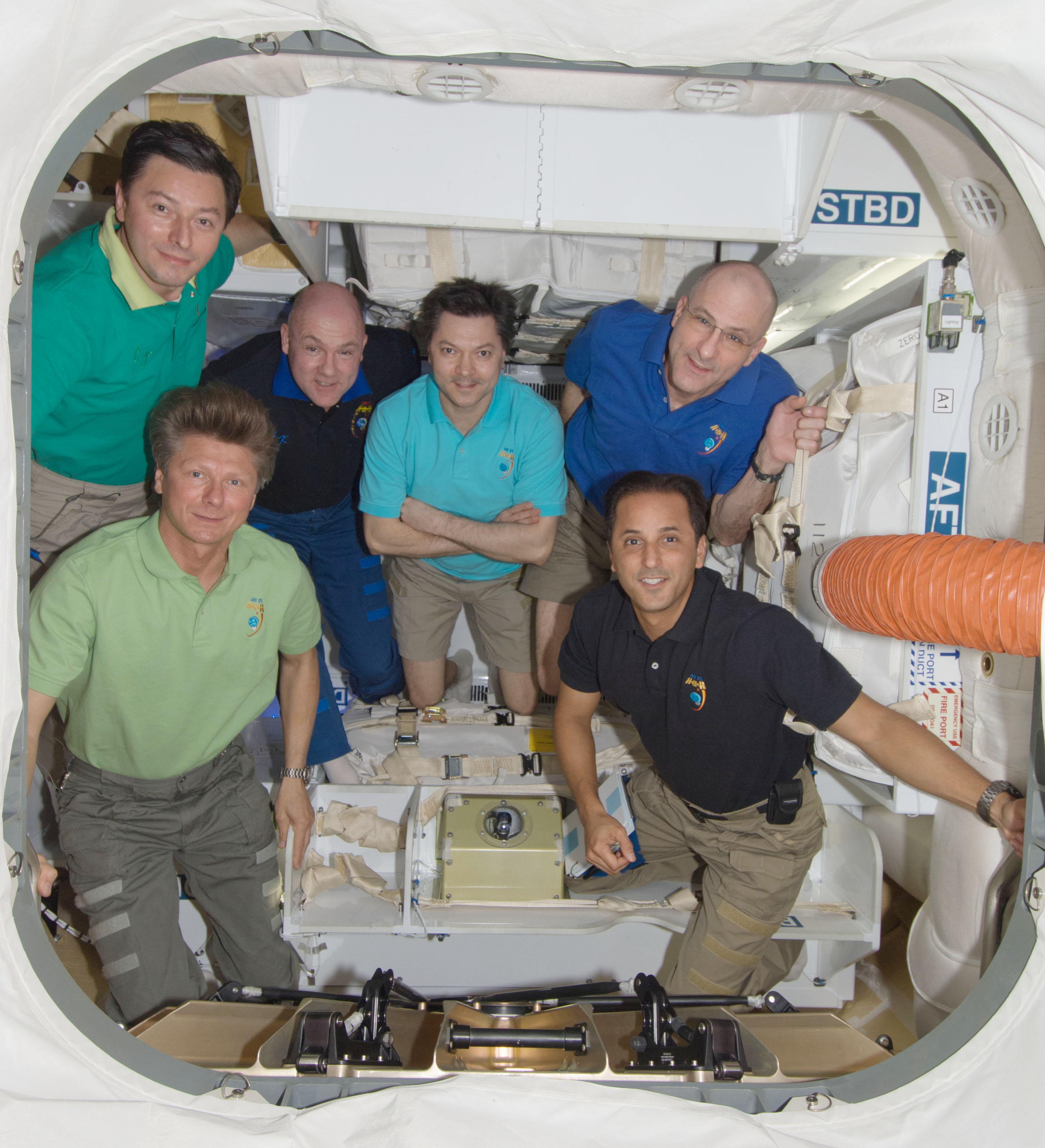
Expedition 31 posing inside of Dragon on 29 May 2012.

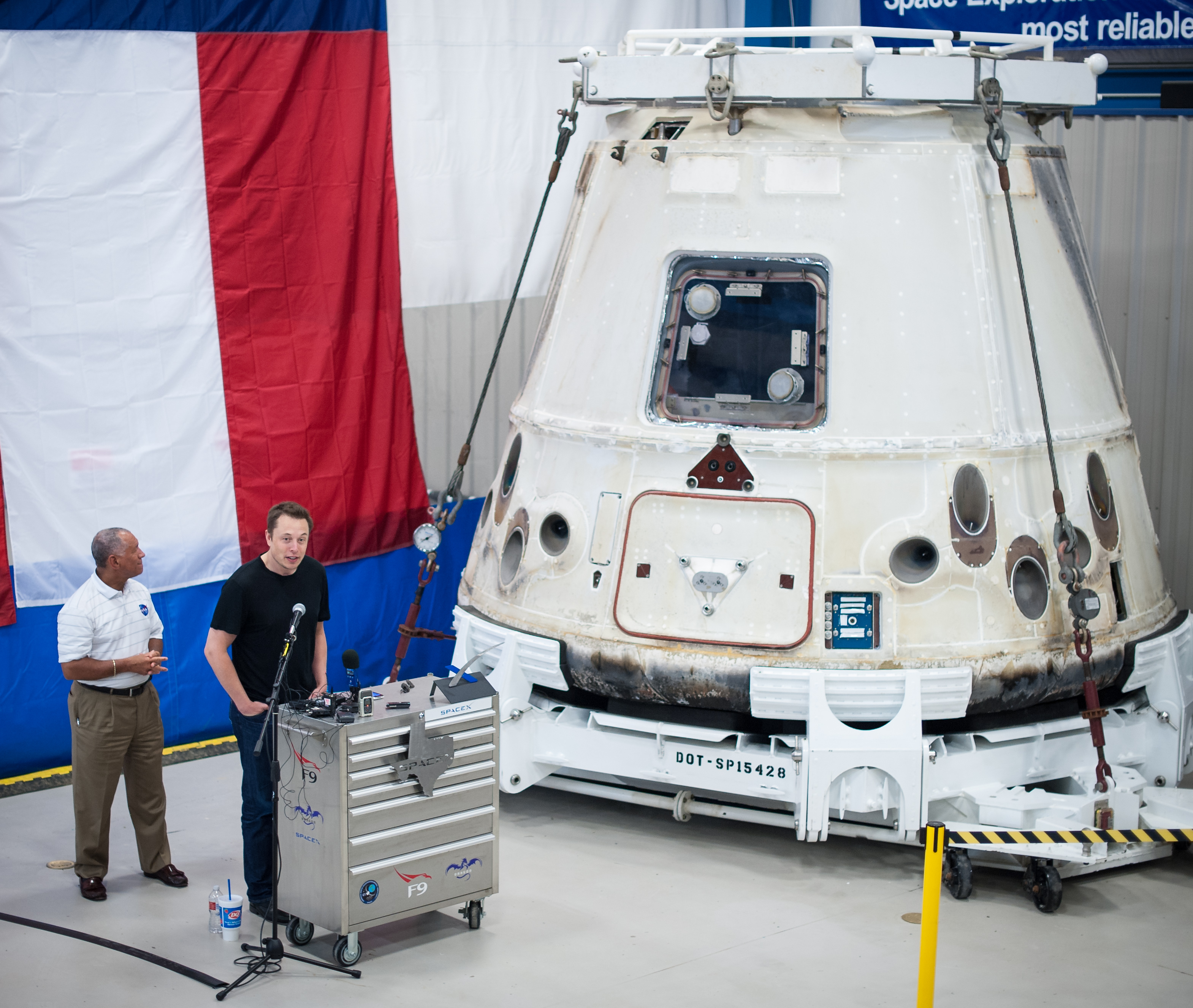
The recovered Dragon C2+ capsule in McGregor, Texas on 13 June 2012.

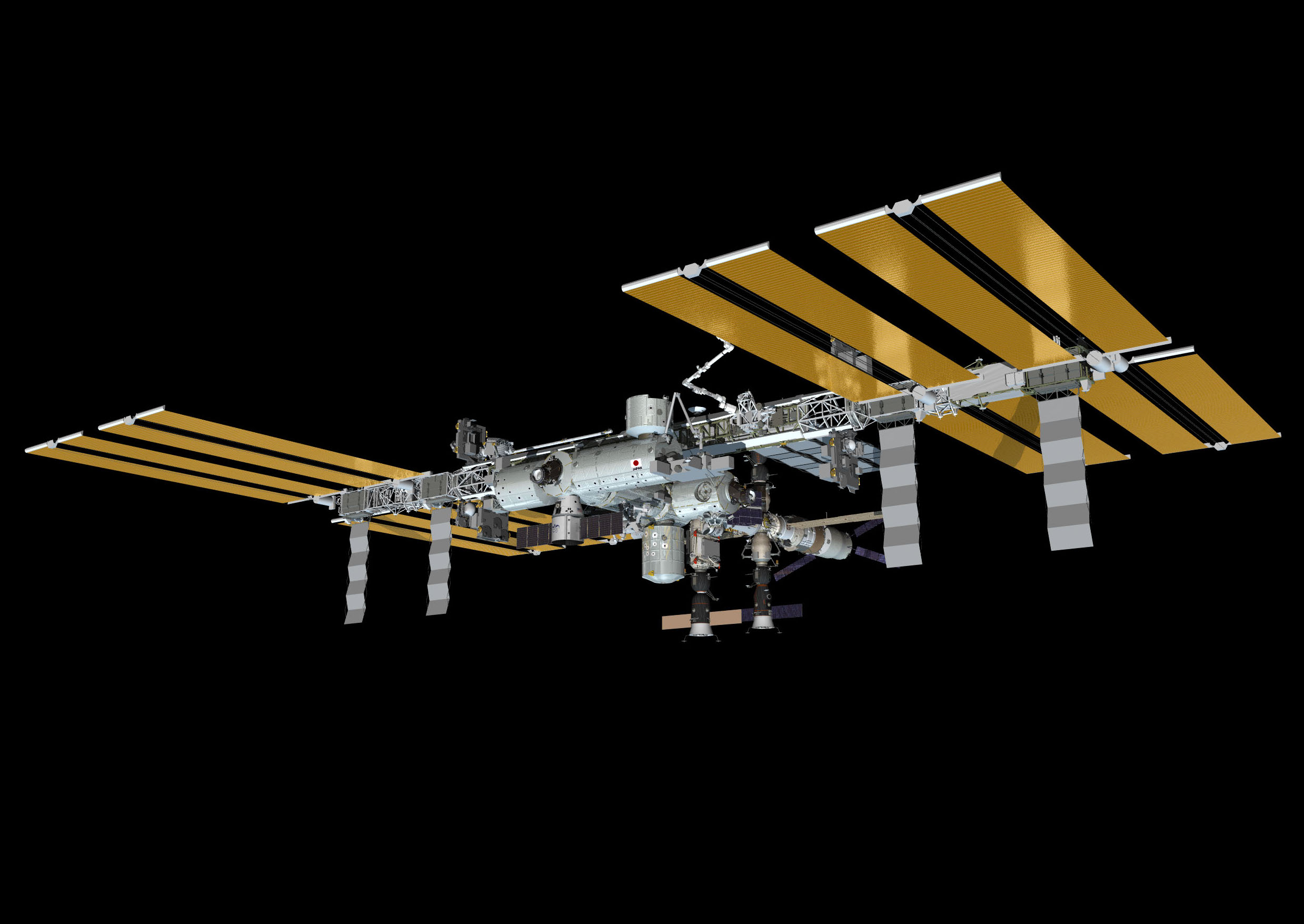
Artist's rendering of Dragon berthed to the ISS

== See also ==
- Cygnus Orb-D1
- List of Falcon 9 launches

== Bibliography ==
- "COTS 2 Mission Press Kit" (PDF) (Press release). SpaceX/NASA. 14 May 2012. Archived from the original (PDF) on 17 July 2012.
- McAlister, Phil (24 July 2012). "Commercial Spaceflight Status Briefing" (PDF) (Press release). NASA. Archived from the original (PDF) on 7 April 2013.
