= Commercial Orbital Transportation Services =

Former NASA program

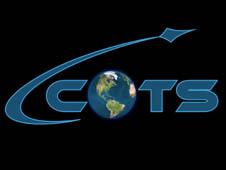
Logo used for the COTS program

The Commercial Orbital Transportation Services (COTS) was a NASA program to spur the development of private spacecraft and launch vehicles for deliveries to the International Space Station (ISS). Launched in 2006, COTS successfully concluded in 2013 after completing all demonstration flights.

NASA's final report on the program considered it a success and a model for future public-private collaboration. Compared to traditional cost-plus contracts employed by NASA, such as the $12 billion contract for the Orion spacecraft, the $800 million COTS investment resulted in "two new U.S. medium-class launch vehicles and two automated cargo spacecraft". After the conclusion of the COTS program, NASA shifted towards fixed-price contracts for crew and cargo services. While the approach has significantly lowered costs for NASA, companies other than SpaceX have struggled under the fixed-price system, with some refusing to bid and others experiencing large losses on contracts.

COTS contracts were awarded to SpaceX and Rocketplane Kistler, but the latter's agreement was terminated due to insufficient progress. Orbital Sciences Corporation replaced Rocketplane Kistler in the program in 2008.

COTS differs from the Commercial Resupply Services (CRS) program, which procured cargo delivery services using the COTS developed vehicles. COTS employed Space Act Agreements with milestone-based payments, while CRS utilizes binding contracts with strict performance obligations. The Commercial Crew Development (CCDev) program, focusing on crew transportation, is similar to COTS and, along with CRS, falls under NASA's Commercial Crew and Cargo Program Office (C3PO).

== Purpose ==
Unlike any previous NASA project, the proposed spacecraft were intended to be owned and financed primarily by the companies themselves and were designed to serve both U.S. government agencies and commercial customers. NASA will contract for missions as its needs become clear.

This was more challenging than existent commercial space transportation because it required precision orbit insertion, rendezvous and possibly docking with other spacecraft. The private spaceflight vendors were competing for four specific service areas:

- Capability level A: External unpressurized cargo delivery and disposal
- Capability level B: Internal pressurized cargo delivery and disposal
- Capability level C: Internal pressurized cargo delivery, return and recovery
- Capability level D: Crew Transportation (was not funded, but formed the basis of the Commercial Crew Program)

== Program rationale ==
NASA explored a program for ISS services in the mid 1990s entitled "Alt Access" for Alternate Access. While NASA funded Alt Access no further than preliminary studies, this program convinced numerous entrepreneurs that ISS could emerge as a significant market opportunity.

After years of keeping orbital transport for human spaceflight in-house, NASA concluded that firms in a free market could develop and operate such a system more efficiently and affordably than a government bureaucracy. The then NASA Administrator Michael D. Griffin stated that without affordable Commercial Orbital Transportation Services (COTS), the agency will not have enough funds remaining to achieve the objectives of the Vision for Space Exploration. In November 2005, Dr. Griffin articulated that:

"With the advent of the ISS, there will exist for the first time a strong, identifiable market for 'routine' transportation service to and from LEO, and that this will be only the first step in what will be a huge opportunity for truly commercial space enterprise. We believe that when we engage the engine of competition, these services will be provided in a more cost-effective fashion than when the government has to do it."

Furthermore, if such services were unavailable by the end of 2010, NASA would have been forced to purchase orbital transportation services on foreign spacecraft such as the Russian Federal Space Agency's Soyuz and Progress spacecraft, the European Space Agency's Automated Transfer Vehicle, or the Japan Aerospace Exploration Agency's H-II Transfer Vehicle since NASA's own Crew Exploration Vehicle, since refocused, would not have been ready until 2014.

In 2007 NASA asserted that once COTS was operational, it would no longer procure Russian cargo delivery services. NASA anticipates that COTS services to ISS will be necessary through at least 2015. NASA projects at most a half-dozen COTS flights a year that would transport 10 tonnes annually. The NASA Administrator has suggested that space transportation services procurement may be expanded to orbital fuel depots and lunar surface deliveries should the first phase of COTS prove successful.

On 22 May 2012, Bill Gerstenmaier confirmed that NASA was no longer purchasing any cargo resupply services from Russia and would rely solely on the American CRS vehicles, the SpaceX Dragon and Orbital Sciences' Cygnus; with the exception of a few vehicle-specific payloads delivered on the European ATV and the Japanese HTV.

== History ==
=== Background ===
In February 2004, NASA awarded a contract to Kistler Aerospace (which later became Rocketplane Kistler) for $227 million, despite the fact that Kistler had already filed for bankruptcy a year before. Some observers saw this as a gift for the head of Kistler, NASA legend George Mueller. This upset Elon Musk, as there had not been a competition and Musk could have used the funding at SpaceX. Musk protested, and NASA withdrew the contract to Kistler after hearing that the Government Accountability Office planned to issue a ruling in support of Musk. NASA returned to the planning phase, and this eventually resulted in the COTS competition.

=== First round ===
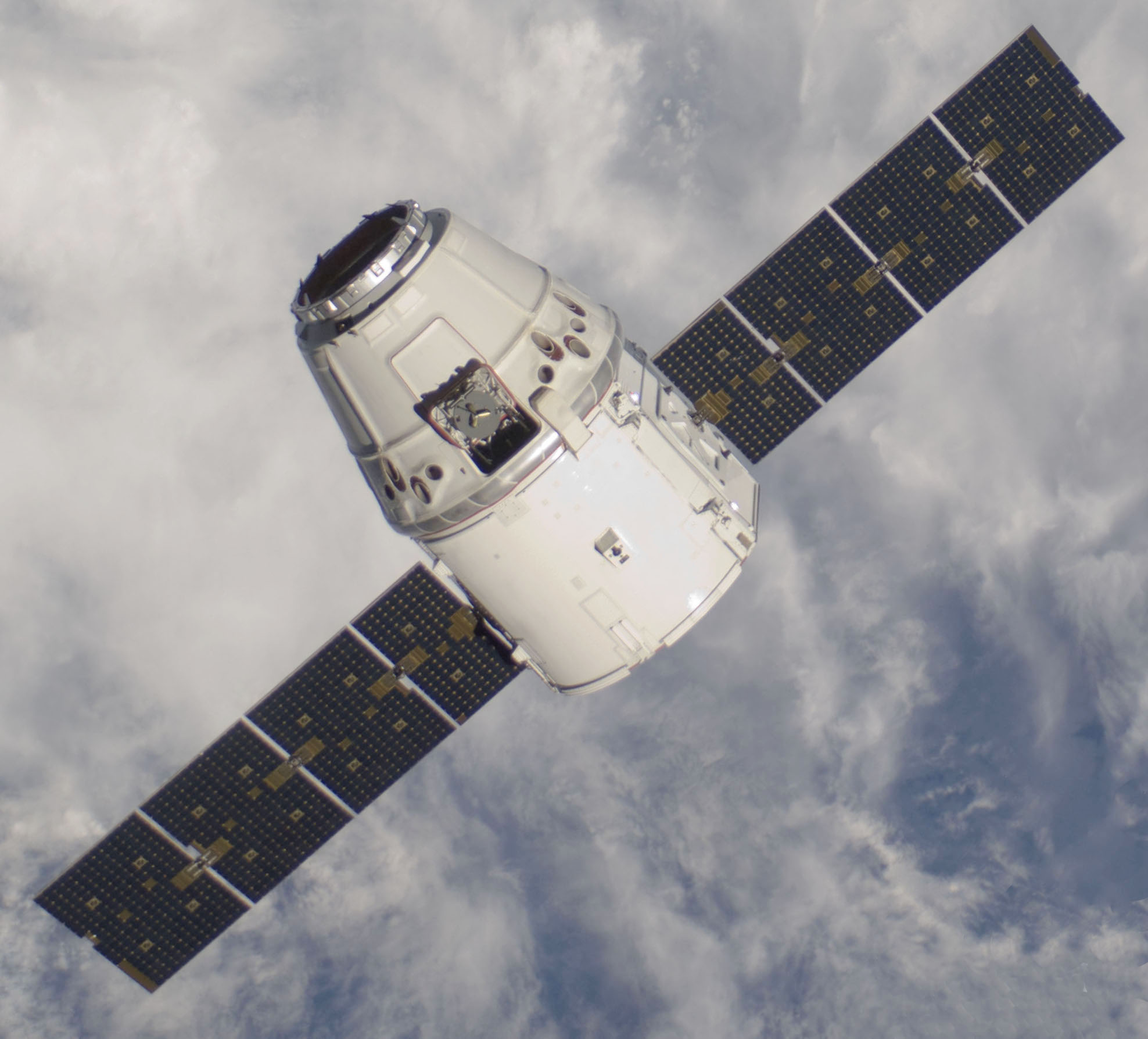
SpaceX Dragon approaches the ISS on its COTS demonstration flight.

Boeing may have submitted a proposal in conjunction with Arianespace to launch the ESA ATV module on a Delta IV rocket. Whereas the ESA launches the ATV on an Ariane 5, the two companies worked together to make this proposal. The ATV can carry up to 7.6 metric tons with a suitable launcher.

In May 2006, NASA selected six semifinalist proposals for further evaluation: SpaceX, Andrews Space, Transformational Space Corp., Rocketplane Kistler ("RpK"), Spacehab, and SpaceDev.

On 18 August 2006, NASA's Exploration Systems Mission Directorate (ESMD) announced that SpaceX and Rocketplane Kistler won Phase I of the COTS program. NASA planned to engage winners in funded Space Act agreements through 2010.

On 8 November 2006 RpK and ATK announced that ATK would become the lead contractor for the K-1.

NASA terminated the COTS agreement with RpK in September 2007 after NASA warned RpK that it had failed to raise sufficient private funding by 31 July 2007 deadline, freeing up $175 million from the COTS budget to be awarded to another company or companies.

=== Second round ===
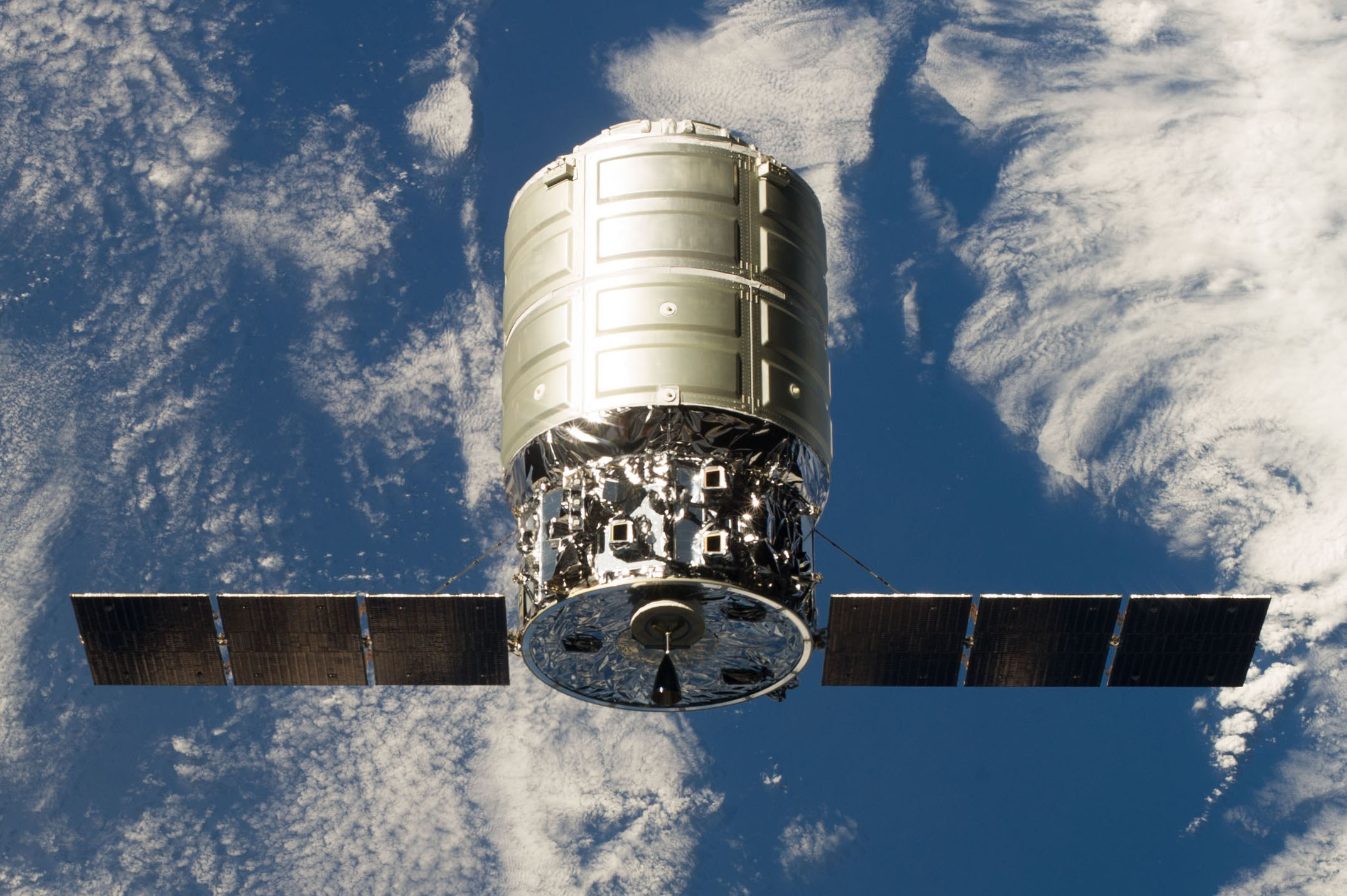
Cygnus approaches the ISS on its COTS demonstration flight.

By 18 June 2007, NASA had signed separate non-reimbursable Space Act Agreements with three additional firms, Constellation Services International (CSI), SpaceDev and Spacehab. These agreements included no financial support, however NASA agreed to share information to help the companies to develop their proposed vehicles.

On 22 October 2007, NASA solicited proposals for the $175 million in unawarded first round funds. Some of the new contenders who entered before the deadline in November 2007 for the funding were Spacehab, t/Space, Andrews Space, PlanetSpace and SpaceDev.

In January 2008 industry sources claimed that the field had been downselected to four; Spacehab, Andrews Space, PlanetSpace and Orbital Sciences, with the announcement date set to 7 February. Several sources later suggested that Boeing and not Andrews was a final contestant.

On 19 February 2008, the second round selection was made to Orbital Sciences Corporation, for the Cygnus spacecraft. NASA's selection statement showed that Orbital beat Boeing on expected lower costs and the added benefit of a new medium lift launcher Taurus II with Andrews, PlanetSpace and Spacehab being eliminated on funding concerns.

Following the original $500M Space Act Agreement, an additional $288M in "augmentation" funding was awarded to the two contractors before the demonstration flights.

=== Program conclusion ===
The COTS program was successfully concluded in November 2013 after two companies, SpaceX and Orbital Sciences, designed, built and launched "a pair of new spacecraft on rockets that also were newly designed". NASA has published its own history of the COTS program including the controlling of the development program using Space Act Agreements (SAA), with lessons for future programs.

== Awards ==
- Rocketplane Kistler — originally awarded contract worth $207 million; Rocketplane Kistler received only $32.1 million before NASA terminated their contract for failure to complete milestones in October 2007.
- SpaceX — awarded contract worth $278 million; in 2011 additional milestones were added bringing the total contract value to $396 million.
  On 22 May 2012 SpaceX COTS Demo Flight 2 completed the NASA and SpaceX Space Act Agreement. Falcon 9 #3 flew capsule Dragon C2+ to the International Space Station. After rendezvousing, berthing and unloading the capsule successfully reentered landing in the Pacific Ocean.
- Orbital Sciences Corporation — awarded contract worth $170 million in the second round in February 2008; in 2011 additional milestones were added bringing the total contract value to $288 million. The Antares (rocket) made its maiden flight lifting a payload mass simulator to low Earth orbit (LEO) on 21 April 2013. On 18 September 2013, Antares successfully launched a Cygnus spacecraft to rendezvous with the International Space Station.

== Competitors ==
More than twenty organizations had submitted COTS proposals by March 2006. NASA received new COTS proposals from at least seven firms by 21 November 2007.

Company	Spacecraft	Launch vehicle	Partner	First round participant	First round semi-finalist	Second round participant	Won round
Orbital Sciences	Cygnus	Antares		?	No	Yes	Yes
SpaceX	Dragon	Falcon 9		Yes	Yes	Yes	Yes
Andrews Space	Andrews Cargo Module	Hercules	Alliant Techsystems, MDA	Yes	Yes	Yes	No
Boeing	ATV	Delta IV	Arianespace, EADS Astrium	?	No	?	No
PlanetSpace	Orbital Transfer Vehicle	Athena III	Alliant Techsystems, Lockheed Martin	No	No	Yes	No
SpaceHab	ARCTUS	Atlas V	Lockheed Martin	Yes	Yes	Yes	No
Rocketplane Kistler	K-1	K-1	Orbital Sciences	Yes	Yes	No	No
Venturer Aerospace	S-550	Falcon 9	SpaceX	Yes	No	No	No
SpaceDev	Dream Chaser	Atlas V	Lockheed Martin	Yes	Yes	?	No
t/Space	Crew Transfer Vehicle	QuickReach	AirLaunch	Yes	Yes	?	No
Constellation Services International	Progress	Soyuz	RKK Energia	?	No	?	No
Lockheed Martin	ATV or HTV	Atlas V	EADS Astrium or JAXA	?	No	?	No
PanAero	Space Van	Space Van		?	No	?	No
Space Systems/Loral	Space Tug	Aquarius	Constellation Services International	?	No	?	No
Advent Launch Services	?	?		?	No	?	No
Exploration Partners	?	?		?	No	?	No
Odyssey Space Research	?	?		?	No	?	No
Thortek Laboratories	?	?		?	No	?	No
Triton Systems	?	?		?	No	?	No

== Demonstration flight tests ==
Flight	Date	Description
Falcon 9 Flight 1	4 June 2010	Launch of boilerplate Dragon spacecraft to test Falcon 9 rocket
SpaceX COTS Demo Flight 1	8 December 2010	Launch of Dragon spacecraft to test its orbital maneuvering and reentry
SpaceX COTS Demo Flight 2	22 May 2012	CRS mission simulation including docking with ISS
Antares A-ONE	21 April 2013	Launch of boilerplate Cygnus spacecraft to test Antares rocket
Orbital COTS Demo Flight 1	18 September 2013	CRS mission simulation including docking with ISS

== Commercial Resupply Services ==
On 22 December 2008, NASA stated they would discuss the contract selection to provide commercial cargo resupply services for the International Space Station. NASA announced the awarding of contracts to both SpaceX and Orbital Sciences Corporation in a press conference on 23 December 2008. The contracts include a minimum of 20 missions, 12 missions for SpaceX ($1.6 Billion) and 8 missions for Orbital Sciences ($1.9 Billion). PlanetSpace submitted a protest to the Government Accountability Office after receiving a NASA debriefing on the outcome of the award. On 22 April 2009 GAO publicly released its decision to deny the protest.

== See also ==
- Cargo spacecraft
- Commercial Crew Development – NASA space program partnership with space companies
- Commercial off-the-shelf
- Space Shuttle successors
- Commercial Lunar Payload Services – NASA program contracting commercial transportation services to the Moon
