= Andrews Cargo Module =

Proposed uncrewed cargo spacecraft

The Andrews Cargo Module was a proposed design for an uncrewed resupply spacecraft which would deliver cargo to the International Space Station (ISS). Andrews Space proposed to NASA that spacecraft of this design be used for the Commercial Orbital Transportation Services (COTS) program. The proposal was ultimately rejected in favor of the SpaceX Dragon and the Orbital Sciences Cygnus.

== Design ==
The spacecraft consists of a common Service Module, a Pressurized Cargo Module (PCM) or an Unpressurized Cargo Module (UCM), and a Recovery Module.

== Associated launch vehicle ==
The spacecraft was to be launched on the proposed Hercules launch vehicle.
