= Cygnus Orb-D1 =

2013 cargo mission to the ISS

Orbital-D1
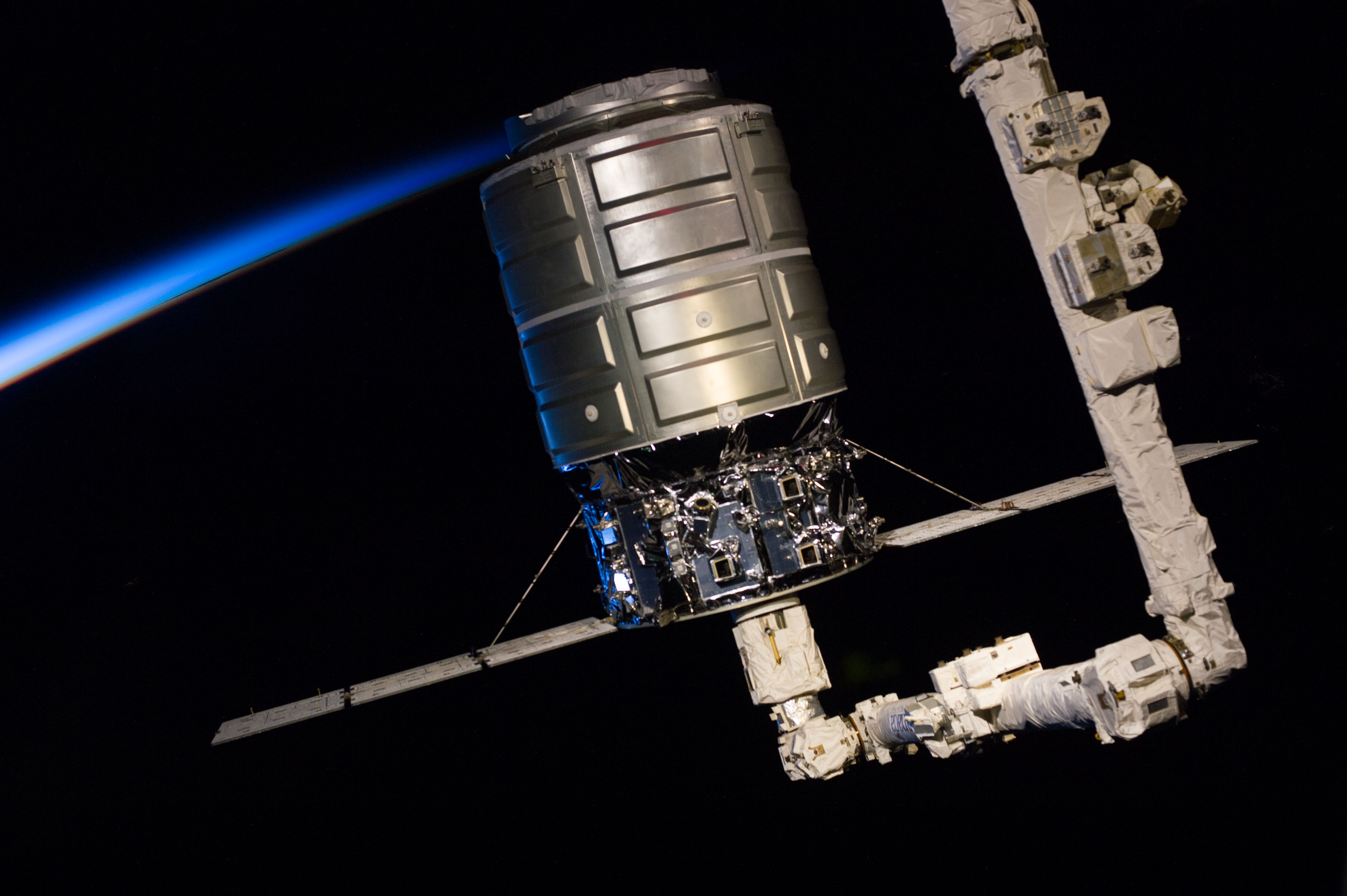
- Canadarm2 grapples the S.S. G. David Low
- Mission type: Test flight; ISS resupply
- Operator: Orbital Sciences Corporation
- COSPAR ID: 2013-051A
- SATCAT no.: 39258
- Mission duration: 35 days, 3 hours, 17 minutes

Spacecraft properties
- Spacecraft: S.S. G. David Low
- Spacecraft type: Standard Cygnus
- Manufacturer: Orbital Sciences Corporation; Thales Alenia Space
- Launch mass: 4,127 kg (9,098 lb)
- Payload mass: 700 kg (1,500 lb)

Start of mission
- Launch date: 18 September 2013, 14:58:02 UTC (10:58:02 am EDT)
- Rocket: Antares 110
- Launch site: MARS, Pad 0A

End of mission
- Disposal: Deorbited
- Decay date: 23 October 2013, 18:16 UTC

Orbital parameters
- Reference system: Geocentric orbit
- Regime: Low Earth orbit
- Inclination: 51.65°

Berthing at ISS
- Berthing port: Harmony nadir
- RMS capture: 29 September 2013, 11:00 UTC
- Berthing date: 29 September 2013, 12:44 UTC
- Unberthing date: 22 October 2013, 10:04 UTC
- RMS release: 22 October 2013, 11:31 UTC
- Time berthed: 22 days, 21 hours, 20 minutes
- Orbital mission patch Commercial Orbital Transportation Services Cygnus flights

Orbital-D1, also known as Orb-D1, and Cygnus 1, was the first flight of the Cygnus cargo spacecraft developed by Orbital Sciences Corporation. It was named after the late NASA astronaut and Orbital Sciences executive G. David Low. The flight was carried out by Orbital Sciences under contract to NASA as Cygnus' demonstration mission in the Commercial Orbital Transportation Services (COTS) program. The mission launched on 18 September 2013 at 14:58:02 UTC. Cygnus was the seventh type of spacecraft to visit the International Space Station (ISS), after the crewed Soyuz and Space Shuttle, and uncrewed Progress, ATV, HTV and Dragon 1.

== Spacecraft ==
The Cygnus Orb-D1 mission was the first flight of the Cygnus spacecraft and used the standard configuration with a Pressurized Cargo Module (PCM), built by Thales Alenia Space, in Italy.

Orbital named this mission's Cygnus spacecraft the G. David Low after the former NASA astronaut and Orbital employee who died of cancer on 15 March 2008. During a media briefing for the Cygnus Orb-1 mission, Orbital Sciences executive vice president Frank Culbertson stated, "We were very proud to name that [Cygnus] the G. David Low".

== Launch and early operations ==
Cygnus Orb-D1 was launched by an Antares 110 launch vehicle flying from Pad 0A at the Mid-Atlantic Regional Spaceport (MARS). The launch took place at 14:58:02 UTC on 18 September 2013, and successfully inserted the Cygnus into low Earth orbit. The launch marked the second flight of the Antares launch vehicle and the final flight of the interim Antares 110 configuration.

== ISS rendezvous ==
Rendezvous with the ISS was originally scheduled for the fourth day of the mission. However, the rendezvous was postponed due to a computer data link problem. The exact error related to small discrepancies between the way the ISS and Cygnus each use GPS for timekeeping purposes. A further delay was necessary to allow for the arrival of Soyuz TMA-10M with three new ISS crew members.

A week late, the spacecraft conducted a series of navigation, control and safety tests as it approached the station. Following the successful completion of ten test objectives, the spacecraft was cleared to make its final approach, holding 12 m (39 ft) below the ISS. Then, Italian astronaut Luca Parmitano grappled it at 11:00 UTC, on 29 September 2013, using the Canadarm2 Mobile Servicing System (MSS) as the two spacecraft sailed high above the Indian Ocean. Cygnus was berthed to the nadir port of the station's Harmony node.

== Payload ==
Cygnus Orb-D1 carried 700 kg (1,500 lb) of cargo to the ISS, including food and spare parts. After unloading, the spacecraft was loaded with 1,290 kg (2,840 lb) of cargo for disposal.

== End of mission ==
On 22 October 2013, the Canadarm2 was used to unberth the Cygnus spacecraft from the nadir port of the Harmony module at 10:04 UTC. The spacecraft was then maneuvered to a release position below the station, where it was released from the RMS at 11:31 UTC. It then performed a series of separation maneuvers away from the station. The spacecraft fired its main engine to de-orbit itself on 23 October 2013 at 17:41 UTC, with reentry and burning up in the atmosphere over the southern Pacific Ocean occurring at 18:16 UTC.

== Gallery ==
Cygnus Orb-D1
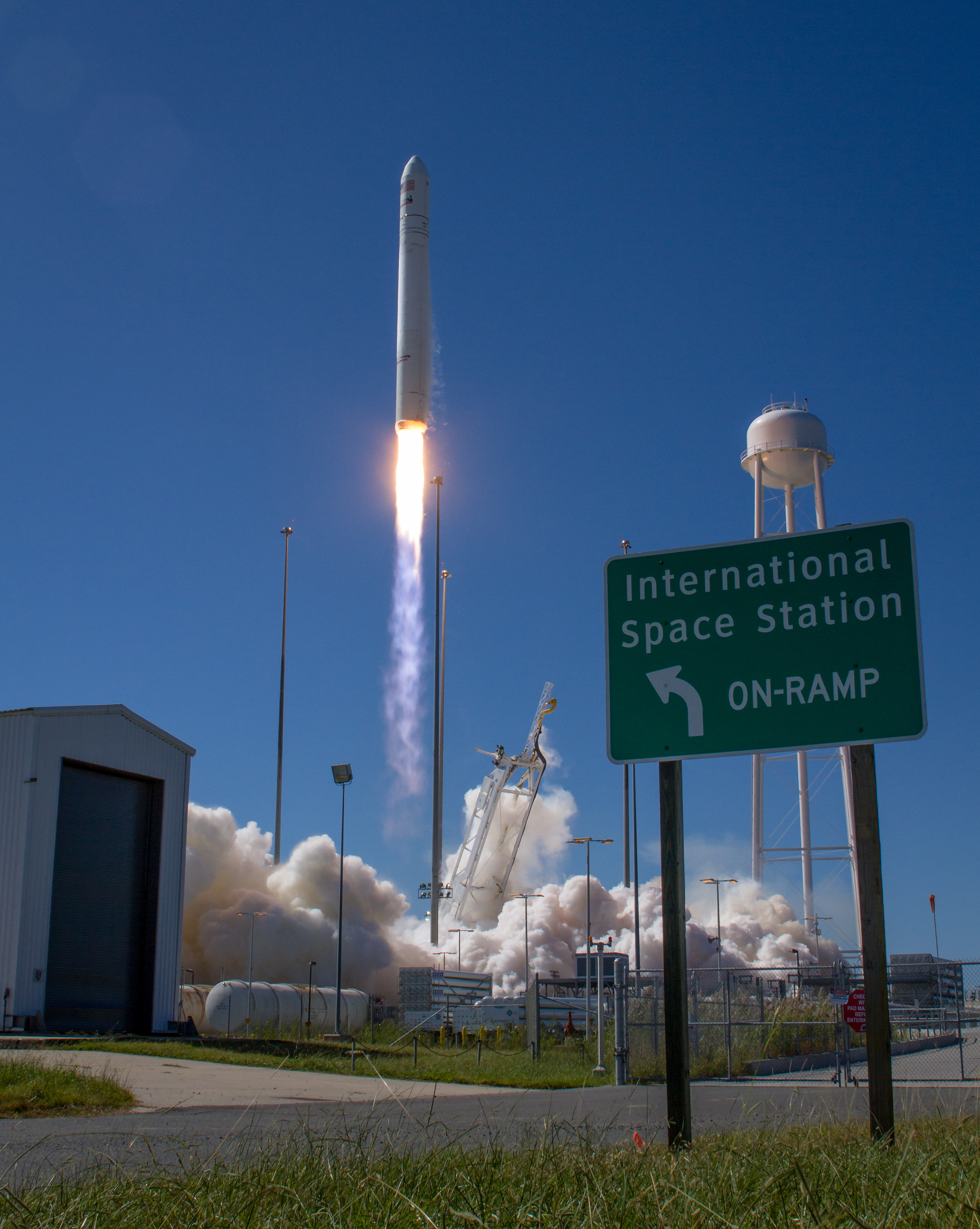
Launch of Orb-D1

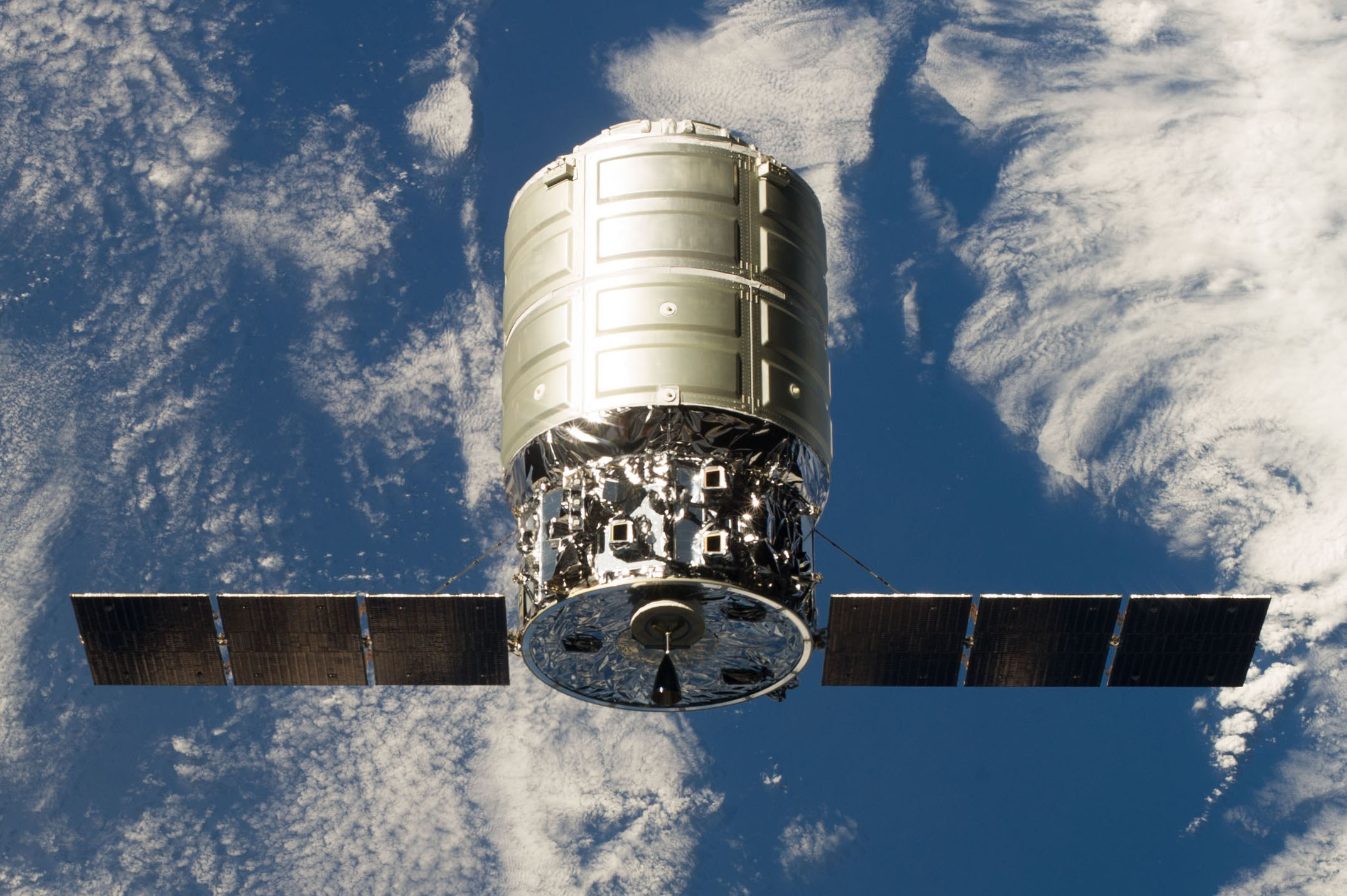
Cygnus approaching the ISS

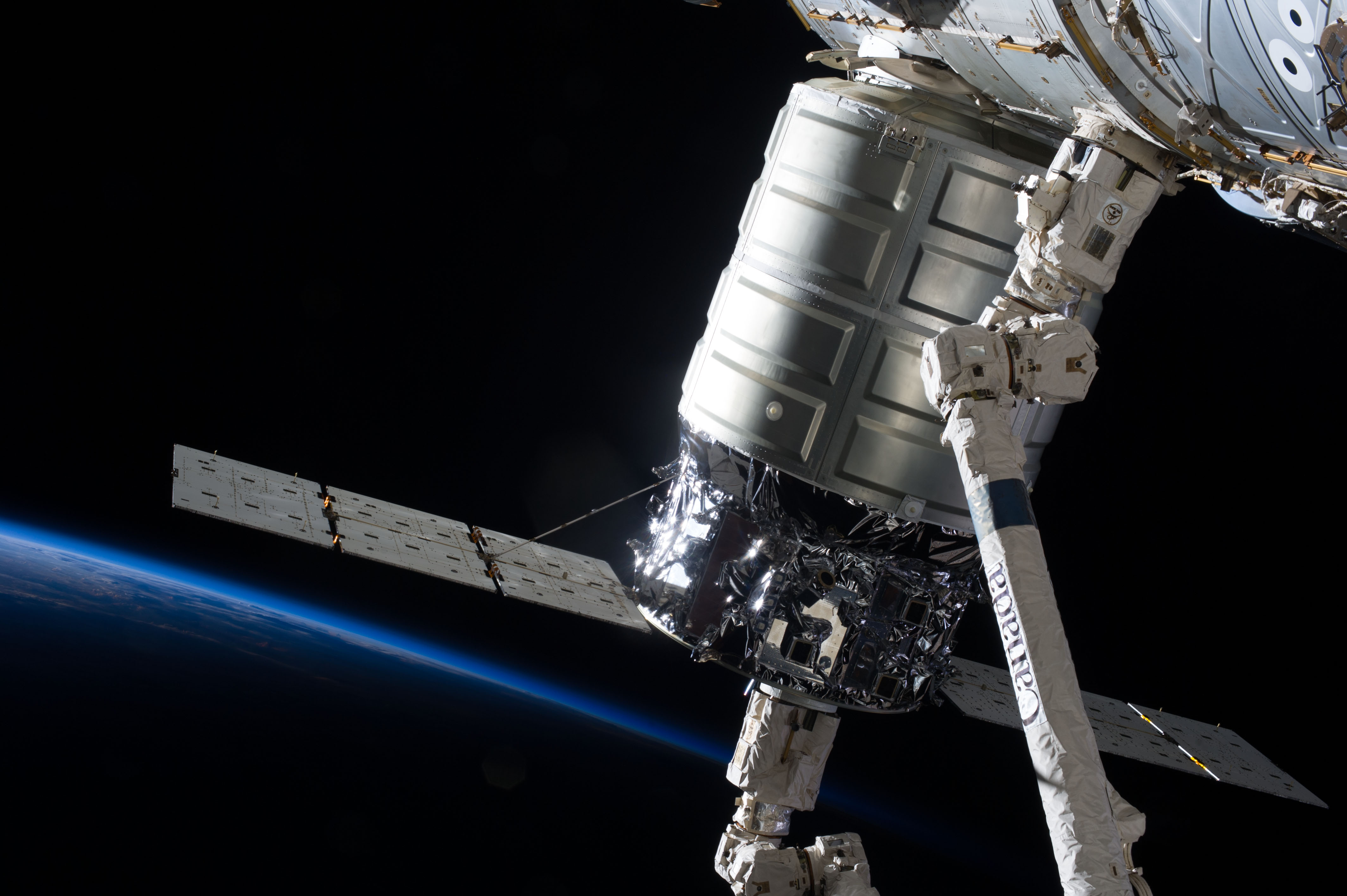
Cygnus docked to the ISS
