= T/Space =

Aerospace company which helps transport crew & cargo to the ISS

Transformational Space Corporation (t/Space)
- Type: Private
- Industry: Launch services, prototyping, exploration technologies
- Genre: Commercial spaceflight
- Founded: Early 2004
- Headquarters: Reston, Virginia, United States
- Key people: Charles A. Duelfer (CEO, Chairman); David Gump (President)
- Products: CVX crewed vehicle
- Services: Consultation services
- Website: www.transformspace.com

t/Space (or Transformational Space Corporation) was an American aerospace company which participated in NASA's Commercial Orbital Transportation Services (COTS), and later, Commercial Crew Development (CCDev) programs for delivering cargo and crew to the International Space Station. The company was headquartered in Reston, Virginia.

== History ==
In September 2004 t/Space was one of eleven companies selected by NASA to conduct preliminary concept studies for the Crew Exploration Vehicle and human lunar exploration, for which it received a US$3 million contract. The company was competing with larger and more established companies such as Lockheed Martin, Boeing, and Northrop Grumman to provide vehicle and architecture advice to NASA for the Vision for Space Exploration.

In May 2006, out of a field of more than 20 firms of all sizes, the company was one of six finalists in the COTS competition for funded agreements with NASA. SpaceX and Rocketplane Kistler received the two funded agreements in August 2006.

In January 2007, NASA signed a Space Act Agreement with t/Space on technical assistance and data access to help the company develop its privately funded spacecraft for bringing passengers and cargo to the ISS and to private space habitats.

In 2011, t/Space proposed a recoverable, reusable transfer spacecraft—for an eight-person crew or space cargo—to NASA under the Commercial Crew Development phase 2 program (CCDev2). The concept spacecraft could launch on a variety of launch vehicles, including the Atlas V, Falcon 9 and Taurus II. The t/Space proposal was not selected for NASA funding.

Apparently t/space went out of business sometime before 2013.

== People ==
The company's CEO is Charles Duelfer who ran the search for weapons of mass destruction in Iraq and the President is David Gump of LunaCorp. Lon Levin, a co-founder of XM Satellite Radio, is the Chief Strategy Officer; Jim Voss, a five-time astronaut and member of Expedition Two to the ISS, is Vice President of Space Exploration Technology; and Bretton Alexander, a former White House aide who helped draft the plan to explore the Moon and Mars, is Vice President of Corporate and External Affairs.

== CXV proposal ==
t/Space was working on designs for an air-launched passenger-carrying capsule termed the Crew Transfer Vehicle, or CXV. In contrast to the Space Shuttle and other companies' CEV proposals, this craft would be specialized for transferring astronauts to and from low Earth orbit along with modest amounts of cargo on the same flights. The capsule would be launched on an upscaled version of AirLaunch's QuickReach rocket under development for DARPA's FALCON program. This rocket would be dropped from the bottom of a custom-designed Scaled Composites aircraft, or a modified Boeing 747, with landing gear modifications to accommodate the rocket. The return capsule uses a design similar to that of the Corona spy satellites. The capsule structure would be built by Scaled Composites.

Under their plan, the CXV would have been capable of docking with the International Space Station, a commercial habitat such as those being developed by Bigelow Aerospace, or a CEV specialized for Earth-Moon transit.

== VSE proposal ==
t/Space's proposal for using cargo canisters as lunar habitats

t/Space's proposed architecture for the Vision for Space Exploration emphasized market-based competition, with initial government funding intended to spawn a self-sustaining commercial infrastructure. In their proposal, NASA would have acted as a general goal-setter and consumer, t/Space would have developed an open overall architecture, and other companies would have competed to construct components of that architecture.

As of their December 2004 midterm architecture briefing to NASA, their proposed transportation architecture included three types of elements: Spiral 1 (Earth-to-orbit), Spiral 2 (Earth-to-Moon), and launch elements. In general, their plan for a lunar expedition involved the use of a flotilla of small, simple, and inexpensive vehicles, rather than a single elaborate vehicle.

=== Spiral 1 (Earth-to-orbit) ===
Initially this would have consisted only of an S1 CXV, a small craft designed to transport a crew of up to six between the Earth's surface and low Earth orbit.

In preparation for a lunar mission a series of S1 Tankers would have been designed and launched, to transport propellant to orbit.

=== Spiral 2 (Earth-to-Moon) ===
The S2 CEV was designed to transport up to six crew between low Earth orbit and the Moon. These vehicles would have been launched uncrewed, with crew being launched on an S1 CXV and transferring in-orbit to the larger craft via docking. For each S2 CEV, eight S1 Tanker flights were needed to supply fuel in orbit. After a mission the S2 CEV wouldn't have reentered the atmosphere, but would have instead transferred crew back to an S1 CXV.

The S2 Tanker was designed to supply fuel to S2 CEVs en route to the Moon. Filling an individual S2 Tanker would have required sixteen S1 Tanker flights.

The plan for a lunar mission involved two S2 CEVs departing from Earth orbit with crews of 2-3 (half the maximum) and large amounts of cargo (much of which was to be deposited at the Moon). The S2 CEVs were refueled en route by the S2 Tankers. If one of the S2 CEVs were damaged, the crew from both vehicles could empty excess cargo from the remaining vehicle and use a single S2 CEV to return to Earth orbit. If both vehicles were operational, additional lunar samples may have been returned.

=== Launch elements ===
The architecture was intended to be modular, with Spiral 1 and 2 elements to be launched on commercially produced rockets. The company was outlining a couple of options: an airplane-launched rocket system to be developed by Scaled Composites and AirLaunch LLC, and ground launch systems developed by companies such as SpaceX and Kistler Aerospace.

== Gallery ==
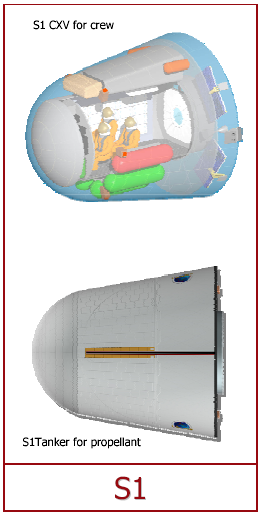
Spiral 1 elements

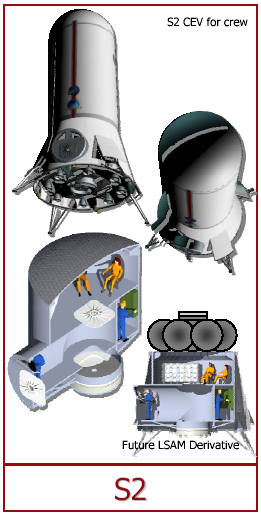
Spiral 2 elements

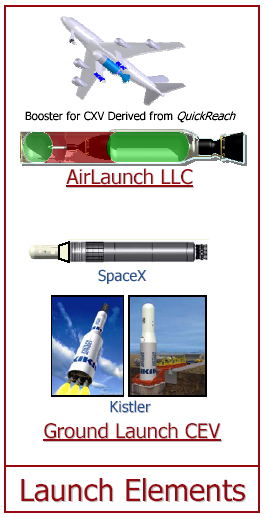
Launch elements
