= Advanced Research and Conventional Technology Utilization Spacecraft =

Proposed uncrewed cargo spacecraft

ARCTUS (the "Advanced Research and Conventional Technology Utilization Spacecraft") was a proposed design by Astrotech Corporation and developed with its partners Lockheed Martin, United Launch Alliance, Cimarron and Odyssey Space Research for a robotic spacecraft that would deliver cargo to the International Space Station, NASA COTS program. ARCTUS was planned to be launched by an Atlas V rocket. Its pressurized cargo module would return to Earth and be recovered with a mid-air retrieval operation.

== Automated Rendezvous and Proximity Operations (ARPO) System ==
The ARPO system is designed to take the ARCTUS vehicle from the ISS stay-out zone to the ISS capture box. ARCTUS will then be grappled by the Space Station Remote Manipulator System (SSRMS) and berthed on an ISS port (nominally ISS Harmony Nadir port).

Avionics The brain of ARCTUS is derived from the flight proven XSS-11 avionics and consists of a spacecraft computer, communications and power systems, guidance and navigation system, and associated software. The majority of the avionics will be housed inside the PCM to allow for recovery and reuse for future missions.

Payload Accommodations The ARCTUS payload accommodations are based on SPACEHAB's 20 years of experience in delivering NASA, ESA, JAXA, Roscosmos, and commercial cargo to space.

Environmental Control and Life Support System (ECLSS) The ECLSS will maintain the pressurized environment (temperature and pressure) within the cargo requirements during all flight phases, as well crew requirements, while docked. The system will utilize SPACEHAB and ISS heritage hardware and a design similar to other ISS modules in order to minimize crew training and procedure development.

== See also ==
- Commercial Orbital Transportation Services
