= AirLaunch =

Defunct aerospace Company

- Company type: Private
- Industry: Aerospace and defense
- Founded: 2003
- Headquarters: Kirkland, Washington, United States
- Key people: Gary C Hudson (Founder, CEO), Debra Facktor Lepore (President), Livingston Holder (Chief Program Executive), Curtis Gifford (Chief Operating Officer), Bevin McKinney (Chief Engineer)
- Products: Orbital rocket launch; Aerospace hardware
- Website: www.airlaunchllc.com

AirLaunch was an aerospace design and development company headquartered in Kirkland, Washington. They had hoped to provide launch services for launching payloads into orbits around the Earth. This was to be realized through a method called air launch where a rocket is carried to high altitude by an aircraft and then released for launch. The rocket engine is then ignited to launch the rocket (with its payload) into a low Earth orbit (LEO).

The principal advantage of a rocket being launched by a high flying airplane is that it need not fly through the low, dense atmosphere, the drag of which requires a considerable amount of extra work and thus mass of propellant. Another advantage is to precisely launch a payload into any orbital inclination at any time, and from a much wider variety of geographic launch locations.

== Falcon Small Launch Vehicle ==
On June 14, 2006, the firm, in a DARPA sponsored test, dropped a 72,000 pounds (33 t) dummy payload from the back of a C-17, a record-setting drop for the aircraft type. Airlaunch subsequently carried out upper stage propulsion development for the QuickReach orbital launch vehicle. The QuickReach vehicle is part of the Air Force and DARPA Falcon Small Launch Vehicle Program.

== Conclusion of Falcon SLV program ==
According to a DARPA document dated Oct 2008, the QuickReach phase 2C test firings were completed, and DARPA has concluded its SLV program. AirLaunch subsequently ceased operations in November 2008.
