= List of space programs of the United States =

The United States space programs include NASA for civil space, the United States Space Force for military space, and the National Reconnaissance Office for intelligence space. Commercial interests are also significant is the last decades.

== Definition of space flight ==
Space programs of the United States date to the start of the Space Age in the late 1940s and early 1950s. Programs involve both crewed systems and uncrewed satellites, probes and platforms to meet diverse program objectives.

The definition of what constitutes spaceflight varies. In the United States, professional, military, and commercial astronauts who travel above an altitude of 50 miles (80 km) are awarded astronaut wings. The Fédération Aéronautique Internationale defines spaceflight as any flight over 62 miles (100 km). Uncrewed missions follow the same altitude thresholds.

== Government-led programs ==
The following summarizes the major space programs where the United States government plays a leadership role in managing program delivery.

=== Crewed government-led programs ===
Program	Purpose	Timeline	Organization(s)	Flights	Exemplar mission(s)	Refs
X-15 program	R&D	1957–1968	US Air Force (1957–1968); NASA (1958–1968)	13	X-15 Flight 91	
Project Mercury	R&D	1958–1963	NASA	11	Mercury-Atlas 6	
Project Gemini	Exploration	1961–1966	NASA	19	Gemini 4	
Project Apollo	Exploration	1961–1972	NASA	14	Apollo 11	
Manned Orbiting Laboratory	Space Operations	1962–1969	US Air Force	1	Test Flight	
Space Shuttle program	Space Transportation	1972–2011	NASA	134	5–HST (STS-61); 11–Mir (STS-71, STS-89); 37–ISS (STS-88); 81–Science (STS-1)	
Skylab program	Space Operations	1973–1974	NASA	4	Skylab 2	
Spacelab program	Space Operations	1973–1998	ESA; NASA	16	STS-50	
Apollo–Soyuz Test Project	Space Operations	1975	NASA; Soviet Union	1	APAS-75 Docking System	
International Space Station program	Space Operations	1984–present	NASA; CSA (Canada); ESA (Europe); JAXA (Japan); Roscosmos (Russia)	27 years, 242 days in orbit	STS-104; STS-134; Soyuz TMA-11; Soyuz TMA-08M	
Constellation program	Exploration	2000s–2010	NASA	1	Ares I-X	
Journey to Mars program	Exploration	2010–2017	NASA	1	Exploration Flight Test-1	
Lunar Gateway program	Exploration	2017–2026	NASA; CSA (Canada); ESA (Europe); JAXA (Japan)	0	Habitation and Logistics Outpost; International Habitation Module	
Artemis Program	Exploration	2017–present	NASA; CSA (Canada); ESA (Europe); JAXA (Japan)	2	Orion MPCV; Space Launch System; Starship HLS	

=== Uncrewed government-led programs ===
Program	Purpose	Timeline	Organization(s)	Flights	Exemplar mission(s)	Refs
Viking sounding rocket	R&D	1949–1957	Naval Research Laboratory	11	Viking 11 (1954)	
Project Vanguard	R&D	1956–1959	Naval Research Laboratory	3	Vanguard 1	
Project Farside	R&D	1957	AFOSR	6		
Explorers Program	Exploration	1958–present	US Army (1958); NASA (1958–present)	91	HETE 2; WISE	
Pioneer program	Exploration	1958–1992	NASA; US Air Force (1958–1960); US Army (1958–1960)	8	Pioneer 11; Pioneer Venus Orbiter	
KH-1 to KH-6 Corona	Reconnaissance	1959–1972	Central Intelligence Agency; US Air Force	142	Discoverer 1	
Samos	Reconnaissance	1960–1962	US Air Force	7	Samos 6	
Television Infrared Observation Satellite	Weather	1960–1968	NASA; ARPA	10	TIROS-8	
Transit	Navigation	1960–1988	Naval Research Laboratory; Applied Physics Laboratory	36	Transit 3B	
Ranger program	Exploration	1961–1965	NASA	4	Ranger 7	
Strategic missile warning programs	Surveillance	1960–present	US Space Force	39	MIDAS; DSP; SBIRS	
Orbiting Solar Observatory	Heliophysics	1962–1975	NASA	8	OSO 3	
Mariner program	Exploration	1962–1973	NASA	7	Mariner 6 and 7	
Centaur upper stage program	Space Transportation	1962–2003	US Army (1957–1960); NASA (1960–1989); US Air Force (1987–2003)	91	68–Atlas; 7–Titan IIIE; 0–STS; 16–Titan IV	
Environmental Research Satellite	Technology	1962–1971	US Air Force	33	ERS 5	
Defense Meteorological Satellite Program (DMSP)	Weather	1962–present	US Air Force; NOAA	39		
Lunar Orbiter program	Exploration	1963–1967	NASA	5	Lunar Orbiter 3	
KH-7 Gambit	Reconnaissance	1963–1967	NRO; US Air Force	38		
Project Vela	Nuclear test detection	1963–1970	US Air Force; ARPA	12	Vela 1A; Vela 1B	
Nimbus program	Weather	1964–1978	NASA	6	Nimbus 1	
National Geodetic Satellite Program	Geodesy	1964–1971	NASA	6	BE-C; PAGEOS; GEOS-2; ANNA 1B	
Electronic & Geodetic Ranging Satellite (EGRS)	Navigation	1964–1970	US Army; Naval Research Laboratory	5	EGRS 1	
Space Experiment Support Program	R&D	1965–1971	Naval Research Laboratory; Air Force Research Laboratory	6	SOLRAD	
Orbiting Vehicle	Technology	1965–1971	US Air Force	37	OV1-9	
Lincoln Experimental Satellite	Communications	1965–1976	US Air Force; MIT Lincoln Laboratory	8	LES-1; LES-3	
Orbiting Astronomical Observatory (OAO)	Astronomy	1966–1972	NASA; UK Science Research Council	2	Orbiting Astronomical Observatory 3	
KH-8 Gambit 3	Reconnaissance	1966–1984	NRO; US Air Force	54		
Applications Technology Satellites	Communications; Navigation; Weather	1966–1979	NASA	6	ATS-3	
Defense Satellite Communications System	Communications	1966–present	US Air Force	63	DSCS-III	
KH-9 Hexagon	Reconnaissance	1971–1984	NRO; US Air Force	19		
Space Test Program	R&D	1971–present	Naval Research Laboratory; Air Force Research Laboratory; US Space Force	251	C/NOFS	
Landsat program	Earth Science	1972–present	NASA; USGS	9	Landsat 9	
Earth and Ocean Dynamics Applications Program	Geodesy	1972–1978	NASA	6	LAGEOS; Seasat; Magsat; GEOS-3	
NAVSTAR GPS	Navigation	1973–present	US Air Force (1973–2019); US Space Force (2019 onward)	77	GPS Block III	
Geostationary Operational Environmental Satellite (GOES)	Weather	1975–present	NOAA; NASA	18	GOES 8; GOES 13	
Strategic planetary missions	Exploration	1975–present	NASA	8	Voyager 2; Cassini–Huygens	
HEAO Program	Astrophysics	1977–1979	NASA	3	Einstein Observatory	
Polar Operational Environmental Satellites (POES)	Weather	1978–present	NOAA; Eumetsat; NASA	16	NOAA-9; NOAA-20	
Tracking and Data Relay Satellite System (TDRSS)	Communications	1983–present	NASA	14	TDRS-1; TDRS-10	
Milstar	Communications	1985–present	US Air Force	6		
UHF Follow-On program	Communications	1988–present	US Navy	11		
Medium Launch Vehicle II (MLV-II)	Space Transportation	1988–2004	US Air Force	14	Atlas II; Atlas IIAS	
Discovery program	Exploration	1990–present	NASA	12	Stardust; MESSENGER	
Great Observatories program	Astrophysics	1990–present	NASA	4	HST; CGRO; Chandra X-ray Observatory	
Mars Exploration Program	Exploration	1993–present	NASA	8	Mars Global Surveyor; Opportunity Rover	
Global Geospace Science	Astrophysics	1994–1996	NASA	2	Wind; Polar	
Evolved Expendable Launch Vehicle	Space Transportation	1998–present	US Air Force	106	xx–Atlas V; 36–Delta IV; xx–Falcon 9	
New Millennium Program	Exploration	1996–2017	NASA	5	EO-1; Deep Space 1	
Earth System Science Pathfinder (ESSP)	Earth Science	1996–present	NASA	7	GRACE; CALIPSO; CYGNSS	
Earth Observing System	Earth Science	1999–present	NASA	5	Terra; Aqua; Aura	
Solar Terrestrial Probes program	Astrophysics	2001–2003	NASA	4	TIMED; STEREO; Magnetospheric Multiscale Mission	
New Frontiers program	Exploration	2003–present	NASA	3	New Horizons; OSIRIS-REx	
Tactical Satellite Program	Technology	2003–2013	Air Force Research Laboratory; Naval Research Laboratory	3	TacSat-2	
University Nanosatellite Program	Technology	2004–present	Air Force Research Laboratory	20	Cornell University Satellite	
X-37B program	R&D	2006–present	US Air Force (2006–2019); US Space Force (2019–present)	6	OTV-3	
Lunar Precursor Robotic Program	Astrophysics	2006–2013	NASA	3	LRO; LCROSS; LADEE	
AEHF Satellite Program	Communications	2010–present	US Space Force	6	AEHF-1	
Living With a Star	Heliophysics	2010–present	NASA	4	Solar Dynamics Observatory; Parker Solar Probe; Van Allen Probes	
Wideband Global Satcom Program	Communications	2011–present	US Space Force	10	WGS-4	
Earth Systematic Missions (ESM) Program	Earth Science	2017–present	NASA	10	GRACE-FO; SWOT; PACE	
Origins Program	Astrophysics	2021–present	NASA	3	JWST	
Weather System Follow-on Program	Space weather	2024–present	US Space Force	1	WSF-M1	

== Commercial space programs ==
The following summarizes the major space programs where private interests play the leadership role in managing program delivery.

=== Crewed commercial programs ===
Program	Purpose	Timeline	Organization(s)	Flights	Exemplar mission(s)	Refs
Space Adventures	Space tourism	1998–present	NASA; Roscosmos; Space Adventures	7	Soyuz TM-32; Soyuz MS-20	
SpaceShipOne	Space tourism	2003–2004	Scaled Composites	3	SpaceShipOne flight 16P	
SpaceShipTwo	Space tourism	2010–present	Virgin Galactic	10	Virgin Galactic Unity 22 Galactic 02	
Blue Origin New Shepard	Space tourism	2015–present	Blue Origin	24	Blue Origin NS-18	
DearMoon lunar tourism	Space tourism	2018–2024	Yusaku Maezawa; SpaceX	0		
Axiom Space	Space tourism	2020–present	Axiom Space; SpaceX	3	Axiom Mission 1 Axiom Mission 2	
Polaris program	Space tourism	2021–present	Jared Isaacman; SpaceX	1	Inspiration4	
Commercial Crew Program	Space transportation	2011–present	NASA; Boeing; SpaceX	7	SpaceX Crew-1; SpaceX Crew-3	
SpaceX Starship	Space Transportation	2012–present	SpaceX	0		
Orbital Reef Space Station	Space Operations	2021–present	Blue Origin	0		

=== Uncrewed commercial programs ===
Program	Purpose	Timeline	Organization(s)	Flights	Exemplar mission(s)	Refs
Telstar	Satellite communications	1962–1995	AT&T	8	Telstar 301	
Comstar	Satellite communications	1963–2000	Comsat General Corporation	4	Comstar D-4	
Westar	Satellite communications	1975–1988	Western Union	7	Westar 1	
Satcom	Satellite communications	1975–2001	RCA Americom	13	GE-1	
SBS	Satellite communications	1975–1991	Satellite Business Systems	6	SBS 2	
Galaxy	Satellite communications	1983–1997	Hughes Communications	9	Galaxy 1	
Commercial Launch Services (Atlas)	Space Transportation	1987–1995; 2006–present	General Dynamics (1987–1994); Martin Marietta (1994–1995)	9 (1990–93); 11 (1994–95)	AC-69/Atlas I	
Iridium	Satellite communications	1987–present	Iridium Communications	170	Iridium 77	
Globalstar	Satellite communications	1991–present	Globalstar	84		
Digital Globe	Earth Imaging	1992–present	Maxar Technologies	8	WorldView-1	
Orbcomm	Satellite data messaging	1992–present	Orbcomm	62		
International Launch Services (Atlas, Proton) (Note: Lockheed Martin sold its interest in ILS to Russian entities in 2006 with ILS continuing as an international entity. Atlas commercial sales reverted to Lockheed Martin via the United Launch Alliance joint venture with Boeing.)	Space transportation	1995–2006	Lockheed Martin (USA); Khrunichev (Russia); Energia (Russia)	100		
Sea Launch (Zenit)	Space transportation	1995–2014	Boeing (USA); Energia (Russia); Aker Solutions (Norway); KB Pivdenne (Ukraine)	36		
DirecTV	Satellite Television	1995–present	DirecTV	19	DirecTV T10 satellite	
Dish Network	Satellite Television	1996–present	DISH Network Corporation	16	EchoStar X	
Sirius XM Radio	Satellite Radio	1997–present	Sirius Satellite Radio (1998–2008); XM Radio (1999–2008); Sirius XM Radio (2008–present)	13	Sirius FM-5	
SpaceX Launch Services	Space transportation	2002–present	SpaceX	xx		
Commercial Orbital Transportation Services	Space transportation	2006–2013	Orbital Sciences; NASA; SpaceX	3	Antares A-ONE; SpaceX COTS Flight 1	
United Launch Alliance Commercial Launch Services	Space Transportation	2006–present	Boeing; Lockheed Martin	xx		
Commercial Resupply Services	Space transportation	2008–2020 (Phase 1); 2016–present (Phase 2)	NASA; Orbital Sciences (2008–2015); Orbital ATK (2015–2018); NG (2018–present); SpaceX; Sierra Nevada (2016–present)	29 (Phase 1); 9 (Phase 2)	SpaceX CRS-1; Cygnus Orb-2	
Planetscope satellite constellation	Earth imaging	2010–present	Planet Labs	487	List of Flock satellite types	
Rocket Lab (Electron) (Note: Rocketlab was founded in New Zealand but made the decision to re-domicile itself to the United States in 2013.)	Space Transportation	2013–present	Rocket Lab	41	List of Electron launches	
Starlink	Satellite Internet Service	2016–present	SpaceX	5,330		
Commercial Lunar Payload Services	Space transportation	2018–present	NASA; Astrobotic Technology; Intuitive Machines; Masten Space Systems	3	Astrobotic Peregrine Lander	

== See also ==
- Space policy of the United States
- List of European Space Agency programmes and missions
- Japanese space program
- British space programme – Official efforts to develop space capabilities
- Chinese space program
- Soviet space program – Space exploration program conducted by the Soviet Union from 1951 to 1991
- List of government space agencies
- List of private spaceflight companies in the United States
- List of rockets of the United States
- List of NOAA satellites
- List of NASA missions
  - NASA large strategic science missions
  - List of uncrewed NASA missions
