= Infinity Fluids =

Infinity Fluids, founded in 1998, is a Massachusetts corporation which develops process and thermal systems for the fuel cell, pharmaceutical, industrial, and biotechnology industries.

It was founded in Norwich, CT and is a manufacturing and research organization specializing in the fields of Fluid Heating, Steam Reforming and Instant Steam Generation. It sued General Dynamics for theft of trade secrets, and they settled out of court in 2017.

== Products ==
Some of the work performed by Infinity includes:

- DI and gaseous thermal systems for the NASA space program.
- Instant steam generators for the pharmaceutical industry, particularly sterilization.
- Increasing efficiency of steam reform systems for fuel cells.
- Marked reduction in size and mass of OEM equipment manufacturing.

== Patents ==
Infinity Fluids holds the patent to:

- Compact Resistive Element System (CRES)
- Electric co-axial heater
- In Line Instant Steam Generator
- Central Axis flow through thermal fluid system
