= SpaceX COTS Demo Flight 1 =

First spaceflight of the SpaceX Dragon spacecraft

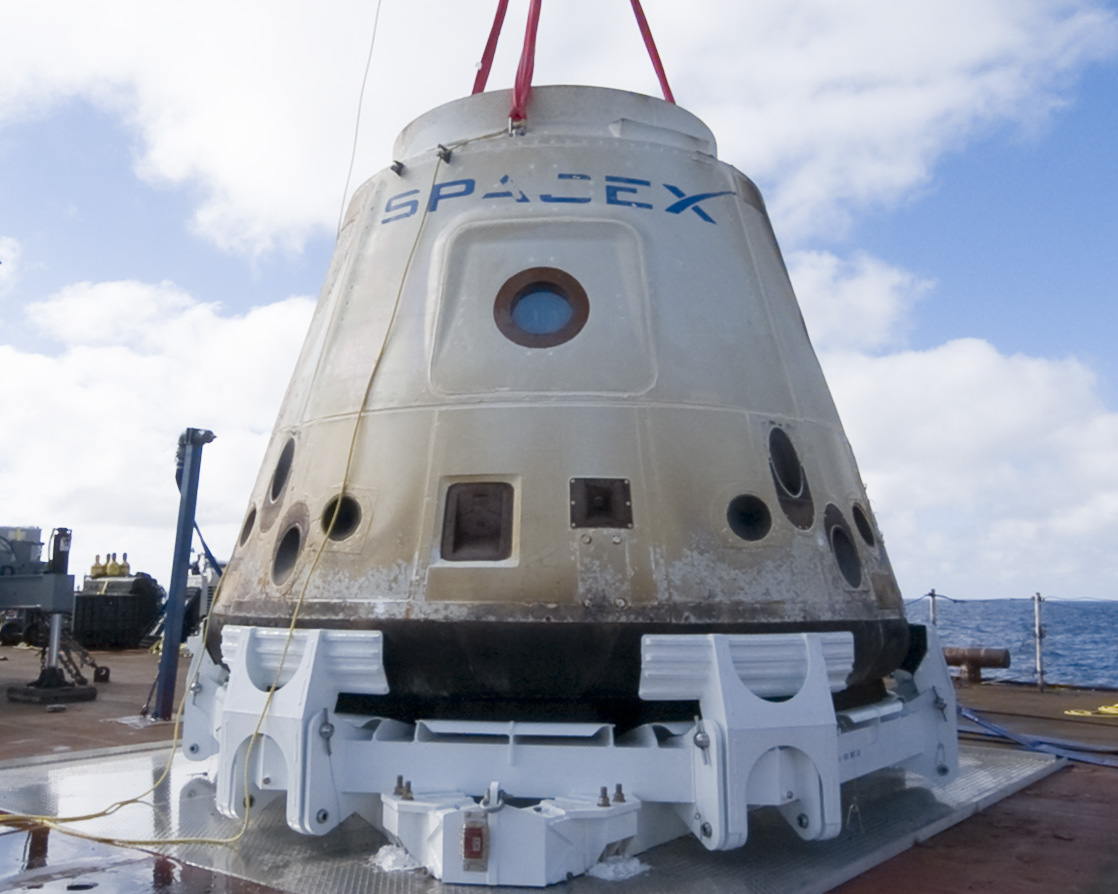
- Dragon capsule after recovery from ocean landing
- Mission type: Flight test
- Operator: SpaceX
- COSPAR ID: 2010-066A
- SATCAT no.: 37244
- Mission duration: 3 hours, 19 minutes

Spacecraft properties
- Spacecraft: Dragon 1 C101
- Spacecraft type: Dragon 1
- Manufacturer: SpaceX
- Launch mass: Falcon 9: 333,400 kg (735,000 lb)

Start of mission
- Launch date: 8 December 2010, 15:43 UTC
- Rocket: Falcon 9 v1.0 (B0004)
- Launch site: Cape Canaveral, SLC‑40

End of mission
- Landing date: 8 December 2010, 19:02 UTC
- Landing site: Pacific Ocean

Orbital parameters
- Reference system: Geocentric
- Regime: Low Earth
- Periapsis altitude: 288 km (179 mi)
- Apoapsis altitude: 301 km (187 mi)
- Inclination: 34.53°
- Epoch: 8 December 2010
- Commercial Orbital Transportation Services Cargo Dragon

SpaceX COTS Demo Flight 1 was the first orbital spaceflight of the Dragon cargo spacecraft, and the second overall flight of the Falcon 9 rocket manufactured by SpaceX. It was also the first demonstration flight for NASA's Commercial Orbital Transportation Services (COTS) program. The primary mission objectives were to test the orbital maneuvering and reentry of the Dragon capsule. The mission also aimed to test fixes to the Falcon 9 rocket, particularly the unplanned roll of the first stage that occurred during flight 1. Liftoff occurred on 8 December 2010 at 15:43 UTC.

The success of the mission allowed SpaceX to advance its vehicle testing plan. With two back-to-back "near-perfect" Falcon 9 launches and satisfactory tests of the first Dragon capsule, SpaceX "asked NASA to combine objectives laid out for the remaining two COTS missions... and permit a berthing at the ISS during its next flight". This combined test mission was completed in May 2012, and achieved its objectives, opening the path to regular cargo deliveries by Dragon to the International Space Station (ISS) under the Commercial Resupply Services (CRS) contract. Commercial flights started in October 2012 with CRS-1.

== COTS contract ==
On 18 August 2006, NASA announced that SpaceX had won a NASA Commercial Orbital Transportation Services (COTS) contract to demonstrate cargo delivery to the International Space Station with a possible option for crew transport. This contract, designed by NASA to provide "seed money" for development of new boosters, paid SpaceX $278 million to develop the Falcon 9 launch vehicle, with incentive payments paid at milestones culminating in three demonstration launches. COTS Demo Flight 1 was the first of the launches under this contract. The original agreement with NASA called for the COTS Demo Flight 1 to occur in the second quarter of 2008; this flight was delayed several times, actually occurring in December 2010.

Separately from the NASA COTS contract, SpaceX was also awarded a NASA contract for commercial resupply services (CRS) to the ISS. The firm contracted value is $1.6 billion, and NASA could elect to order additional missions for a total contract value of up to $3.1 billion.

== Preparations ==
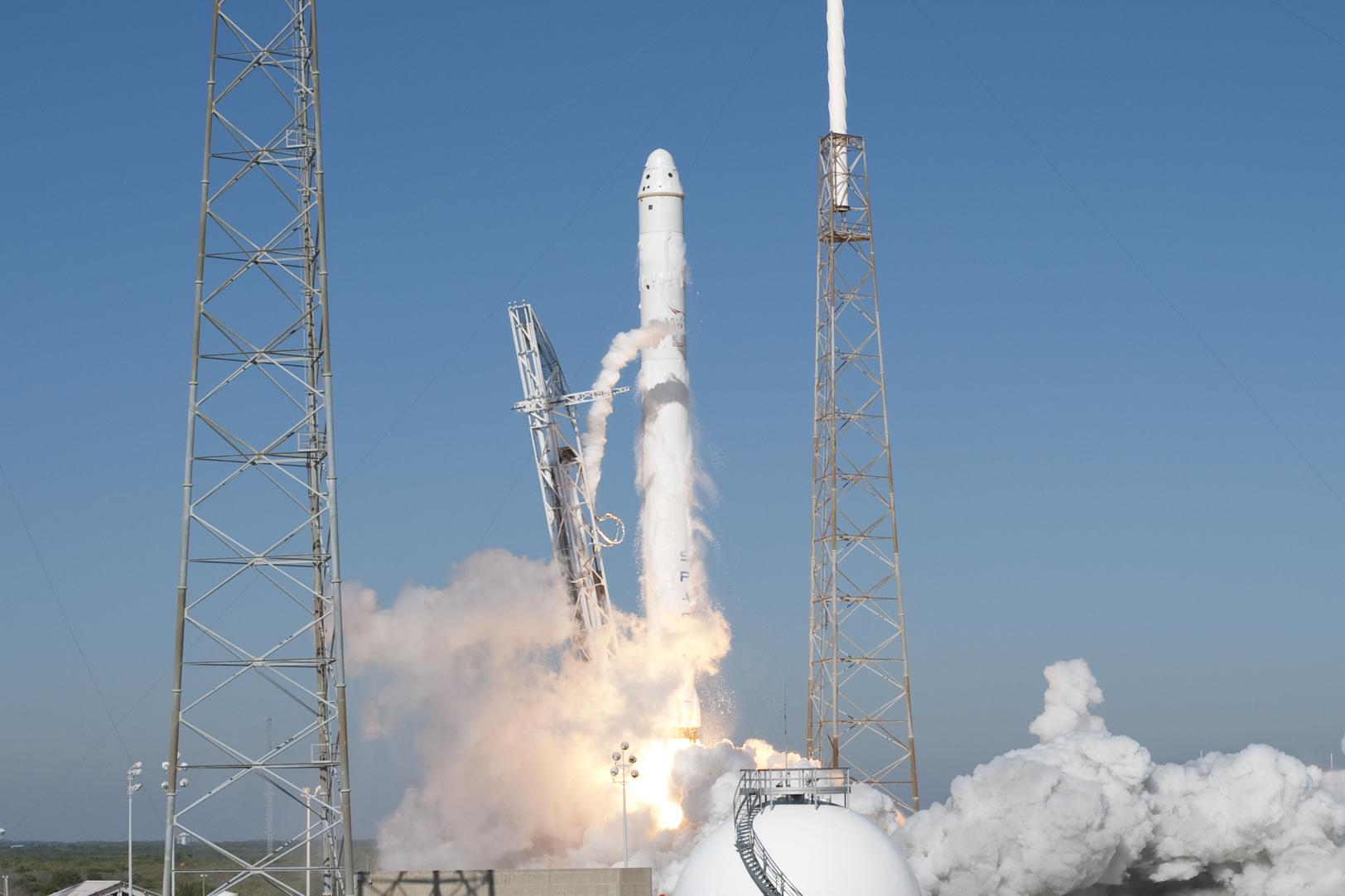
Launch of Falcon 9

Video of launch

The two stages and Dragon capsule for the second Falcon 9 were built at SpaceX's manufacturing facility at Hawthorne, California, and were delivered to SpaceX's facilities at Cape Canaveral in July and August 2010. The target launch date was rescheduled from its original 2008 date to the end of 2010, with COTS Demo 2 and 3 being rescheduled to 2011.

A full wet dress rehearsal was conducted on 15 September 2010, and the launch was targeted for no earlier than 7 December 2010. On 22 November 2010, SpaceX announced that it had received a license for spacecraft re-entry from the Federal Aviation Administration's Office of Commercial Space Transportation for the flight. It is the first such license issued to a private enterprise.

SpaceX needed to conduct a launch vehicle systems test called a "static fire" to rehearse the countdown and engine ignition sequence before going ahead with the launch at a later date. The first attempt came on 3 December 2010 and was scrubbed after only about one second because of a high pressure reading in one of the Merlin engines forced the launch computer to abort the ignition sequence. Undeterred, SpaceX repeated the static test the following day, resulting in the automatic abort of the initial attempt for the same high pressure readings issue as the previous test. Finally, a successful static test fire was performed by SpaceX on their second attempt that day on 4 December 2010.

Following the successful static fire test, SpaceX proceeded with planning for the launch of the Falcon 9 and Dragon on 7 December 2010. However, during an engine inspection conducted after the static fire, engineers identified a 7.6 cm (3.0 in) crack on the outer portion of the niobium extension of the second stage Merlin vacuum nozzle. To address this issue, SpaceX made the decision to remove an unnecessary 38 cm (15 in) from the nozzle, thereby eliminating the crack and fully mitigating the situation. The nozzle reduction resulted in a non-critical loss of engine performance, enabling the launch to proceed the following day.

== Launch events ==
The launch was ultimately scheduled for 8 December 2010, with launch windows available from 14:00 to 14:06, 15:38 to 15:43, and 17:16 to 17:24 UTC based on the availability of the NASA tracking and data relay satellite (TDRS) network used to track and communicate with the spacecraft. The first attempt was originally scheduled for the middle of the first launch window, at 14:03 UTC, but was moved to the end of the window at 14:06 UTC. This attempt was aborted at T-02:48 on the countdown clock because it was related to a false abort on the Ordnance Interrupter (OI) ground feedback on the Flight Termination System (FTS). The launch was re-targeted for 15:43 UTC, and was successful. First stage engines cut off at T+02:56, second stage engines cut off at T+08:56, all as planned. The Dragon vehicle separated at T+09:30 and achieved a near circular orbit, with a perigee of 288 km (179 mi), an apogee of 301 km (187 mi) and an inclination of 34.53°. These were close to targeted marks of a 300 km (190 mi) circular orbit at an inclination of 34.5°.

Attempt	Planned	Result	Turnaround	Reason	Decision point	Weather go (%)	Notes
1	8 Dec 2010, 9:06:00 am	Aborted	—	Automated abort on fault detected in ordnance interrupter	8 Dec 2010, 9:03 am (T–2:48)	80	
2	8 Dec 2010, 10:43:00 am	Successful	0 days 1 hour 37 minutes			80	

== Additional payloads ==
The Falcon 9 carried a small number of nanosatellites to orbit as well. Included were a total of eight cubesats including the first U.S. Army nanosatellite, Space and Missile Defense Command — Operational Nanosatellite Effect, or SMDC-ONE, for a 30-day mission, and two 3U buses, the CubeSat Experiment (QbX), provided by the U.S. National Reconnaissance Office, also expected to remain in orbit for only 30 days.

One of the weight ballasts inside the Dragon spacecraft was a metal barrel containing a wheel of French Le Brouère cheese. This cheese is produced in Bulgnéville, Vosges. It was packed as a joke, and references the Cheese Shop sketch from Monty Python's Flying Circus. The barrel's lid was pasted with an image from the poster for the 1984 spoof film Top Secret!. SpaceX's CEO Elon Musk did not reveal the identity of the cargo during the post-splashdown news conference, for fear of the joke overshadowing the company's accomplishments.

== Orbit and landing ==
=== Dragon ===
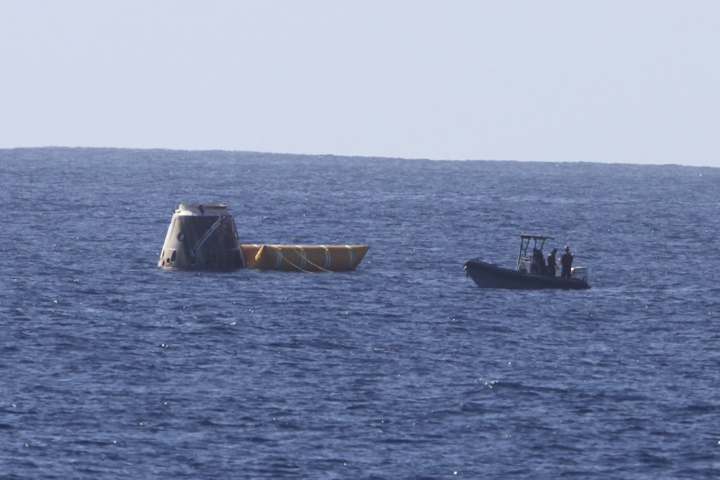
Dragon capsule after re-entry

While in orbit, a battery of automated tests were performed including thermal control and attitude control to maintain uninterrupted TDRS data links. At 16:15 UTC, SpaceX announced that it had achieved contact with the Dragon module through the TDRS system. After the two planned orbits, the spacecraft was manually commanded to begin a deorbit burn, resulting in it splashing down in the Pacific Ocean at 19:02 UTC approximately 800 km (500 mi) west of Baja California after all three parachutes successfully deployed. SpaceX reported that all test objectives were completed, and the recovery craft arrived to retrieve the spacecraft within 20 minutes of splashdown. The craft landed within 800 m (2,600 ft) of the targeted location, well within the 60-by-20-kilometer (37 by 12 mi) recovery zone. From launch to splashdown, the demonstration flight lasted for 3 hours, 19 minutes, 52 seconds.

=== Second stage ===
The second stage engine was reignited in orbit after separation from the Dragon capsule. This allowed SpaceX to work on a secondary mission objective of expanding the launch capability envelope by testing in-space engine reignition and ability of the vehicle to achieve a beyond-LEO (Low Earth Orbit). Even though the nozzle of the Merlin Vacuum second-stage engine had been substantially trimmed—due to two cracks discovered only a few days before the scheduled launch—the second stage reached an altitude of 11,000 kilometers (6,800 mi).

== See also ==
- List of Falcon 9 launches
- SpaceX COTS Demo Flight 2
