= List of private spaceflight companies in the United States =

Private spaceflight companies headquartered in the United States

This is a list of private spaceflight companies in the United States, which includes active companies headquartered in the United States that develop or operate launch vehicles, spacecraft, commercial space stations, or other systems intended to travel to or operate in space.

== List of spaceflight companies by state ==
=== Arizona ===
Company	Headquarters	Principal spaceflight activities
Phantom Space Corporation	Tucson	Develops the Daytona family of small orbital launch vehicles and related satellite transportation systems.

=== California ===
Company	Headquarters	Principal spaceflight activities
Astra Space	Alameda	Develops the Rocket-4 small-satellite launch vehicle and manufactures electric propulsion systems for spacecraft.
Impulse Space	Redondo Beach	Develops orbital transfer vehicles, including the Mira and Helios spacecraft, for satellite deployment and in-space transportation.
Inversion Space	Los Angeles	Develops reusable orbital reentry vehicles designed for rapid cargo return from space.
Relativity Space	Long Beach	Develops the reusable Terran R launch vehicle and related launch technologies.
Rocket Lab	Long Beach	Operates the Electron launch vehicle, develops the Neutron launch vehicle, and manufactures spacecraft and satellite systems.
Vast	Long Beach	Develops commercial space stations, including Haven-1 and the proposed Haven-2 station.

=== Colorado ===
Company	Headquarters	Principal spaceflight activities
Sierra Space	Louisville	Develops the reusable Dream Chaser spaceplane and expandable space-habitat technology.
United Launch Alliance	Centennial	Operates the Vulcan Centaur launch vehicle and the remaining missions of the retiring Atlas V launch system for national-security, civil, and commercial customers.
UP Aerospace	Denver	Provides suborbital launch services using the SpaceLoft XL sounding rocket, carrying research, educational, commercial, and government payloads from Spaceport America.
Voyager Technologies	Denver	Develops spacecraft propulsion systems and space-station technologies, and provides mission-management services for civil, commercial, and national-security spaceflight, including development of the Starlab commercial space station.

=== Maine ===
Company	Headquarters	Principal spaceflight activities
bluShift Aerospace	Brunswick	Develops reusable, biofuel-powered launch vehicles for suborbital research missions and small-satellite launches.

=== Texas ===
Company	Headquarters	Principal spaceflight activities
Axiom Space	Houston	Arranges and operates private astronaut missions to the International Space Station and develops the proposed Axiom Station commercial space station.
Exos Aerospace	Greenville	Develops and operates reusable suborbital launch vehicles, including the SARGE sounding rocket, for research, technology-demonstration, and commercial payload missions.
Firefly Aerospace	Cedar Park	Operates the Alpha launch vehicle and develops the Blue Ghost lunar lander, Elytra orbital vehicles, and the Eclipse medium-lift launch vehicle.
Intuitive Machines	Houston	Develops and operates the Nova-C lunar lander and provides lunar payload-delivery, communications, and infrastructure services.
SpaceX	Starbase	Operates the Falcon 9 and Falcon Heavy launch vehicles and the Dragon spacecraft, and develops and tests the Starship launch system.

=== Washington ===
Company	Headquarters	Principal spaceflight activities
Blue Origin	Kent	Operates the New Glenn orbital launch vehicle and develops the Blue Moon lunar lander and other spacecraft. The company paused its New Shepard suborbital program in 2026 to redirect resources toward New Glenn and its lunar programs.
Radian Aerospace	Renton	Develops Radian One, a proposed reusable single-stage-to-orbit spaceplane intended to carry people and cargo to and from low Earth orbit.
Stoke Space	Kent	Develops Nova, a medium-lift orbital launch vehicle designed with reusable first and second stages.

== See also ==
- Commercial Spaceflight Federation
- Comparison of orbital launch systems
- List of government space agencies
- List of launch service providers
- List of space programs of the United States
- List of private spaceflight companies
- List of rocket launch sites in North America
- List of spacecraft manufacturers
- Private spaceflight
