= Falcon 9 v1.0 =

First version of the SpaceX medium-lift launch vehicle

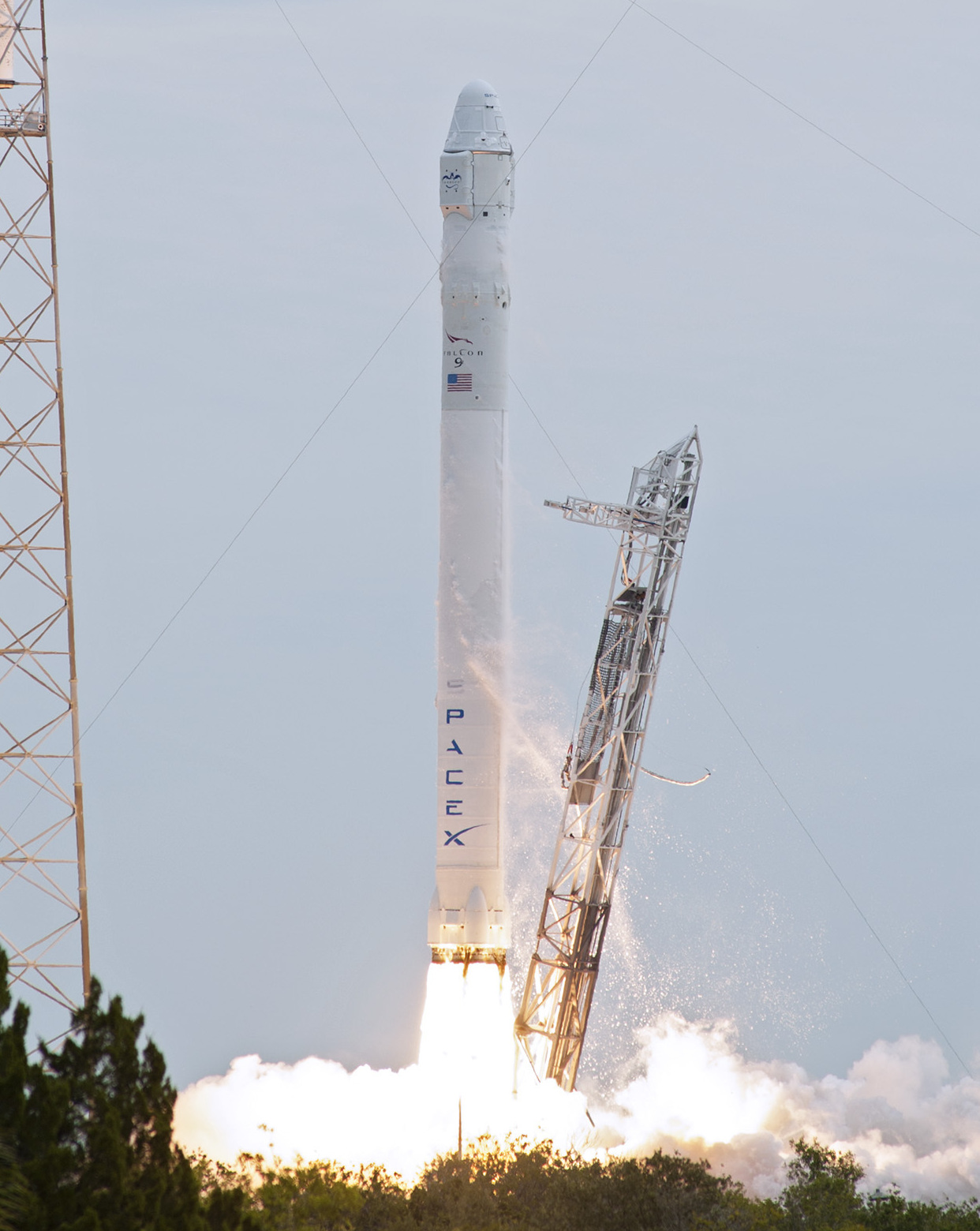
- A Falcon 9 v1.0 launches with a Dragon spacecraft on a cargo resupply mission to the International Space Station in March 2013, the fifth and final flight of a version 1.0 Falcon 9.
- Function: Medium-lift launch vehicle
- Manufacturer: SpaceX
- Country of origin: United States
- Project cost: $300 million (including Dragon)
- Cost per launch: $54–59.5 million

Size
- Height: 54.9 m (180 ft) with payload fairing 47.8 m (157 ft) with Dragon
- Diameter: 3.7 m (12 ft)
- Mass: 333,400 kg (735,000 lb)
- Stages: 2

Capacity

Payload to LEO
- Mass: 9,000 kg (20,000 lb)

Payload to GTO
- Mass: 3,400 kg (7,500 lb)

Associated rockets
- Family: Falcon 9
- Based on: Falcon 1
- Derivative work: Falcon 9 v1.1

Launch history
- Status: Retired
- Launch sites: Cape Canaveral SLC-40
- Total launches: 5
- Success(es): 4
- Partial failure: 1 (secondary payload only)
- First flight: June 4, 2010; DSQU
- Last flight: March 1, 2013; CRS SpX-2
- Carries passengers or cargo: Dragon

First stage
- Powered by: 9x Merlin 1C
- Maximum thrust: 4,940 kN (1,110,000 lb_{f})
- Specific impulse: Sea level: 275 s (2.70 km/s); Vacuum: 304 s (2.98 km/s)
- Burn time: 170 s
- Propellant: LOX / RP-1

Second stage
- Powered by: 1x Merlin 1C vacuum
- Maximum thrust: 445 kN (100,000 lb_{f})
- Specific impulse: 342 s (3.35 km/s)
- Burn time: 345 s
- Propellant: LOX / RP-1

The Falcon 9 v1.0 was the first member of the Falcon 9 launch vehicle family, designed and manufactured by SpaceX in Hawthorne, California. Development of the medium-lift launcher began in 2005, and it first flew on June 4, 2010. The Falcon 9 v1.0 then launched four Dragon cargo spacecraft: one on an orbital test flight, then one demonstration and two operational resupply missions to the International Space Station under a Commercial Resupply Services contract with NASA.

The two stage vehicle was powered by SpaceX's Merlin engines, burning liquid oxygen (LOX) and rocket-grade kerosene (RP-1). Had the F9 V1.0 been used for launching payloads other than the Dragon to orbit, it would have launched 10,450 kg (23,040 lb) to low Earth orbit (LEO) and 4,540 kg (10,000 lb) to geostationary transfer orbit (GTO).

The vehicle was retired in 2013 and replaced by the upgraded Falcon 9 v1.1, which first flew in September 2013. Of its five launches from 2010 to 2013, all successfully delivered their primary payload, though an anomaly led to the loss of one secondary payload.

== Design ==
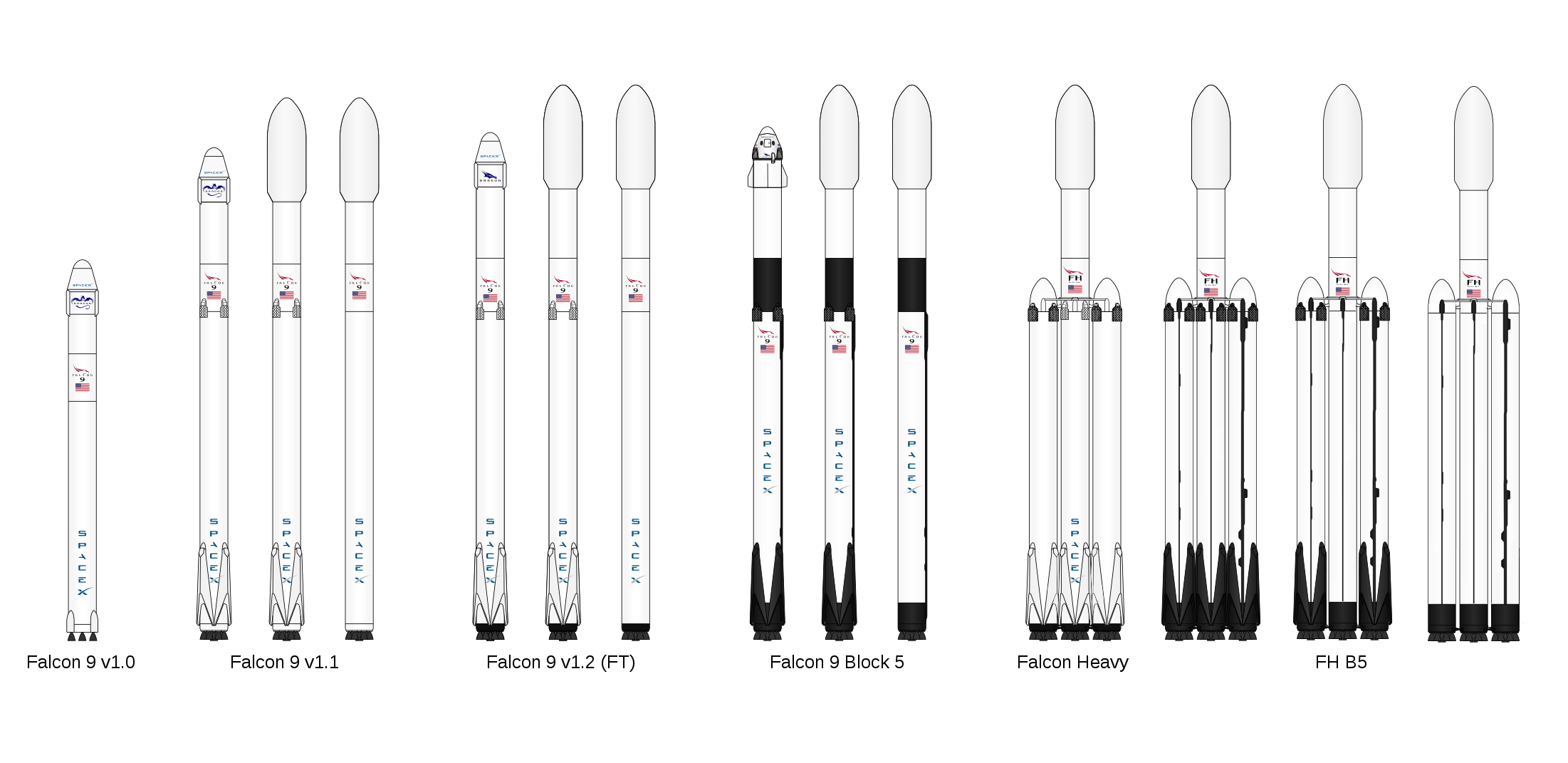
From left to right, Falcon 9 v1.0, three launch configurations of Falcon 9 v1.1, three configurations of Falcon 9 v1.2 (Full Thrust), three configurations of Falcon 9 Block 5 and four of Falcon Heavy.

=== First stage ===
The Falcon 9 v1.0 first stage was used on the first five Falcon 9 launches, and powered by nine SpaceX Merlin 1C rocket engines arranged in a 3x3 pattern. Each of these engines had a sea-level thrust of 556 kN (125,000 pounds-force) for a total thrust on liftoff of about 5,000 kN (1,100,000 pounds-force).

The Falcon 9 tank walls and domes were made from aluminum lithium alloy. SpaceX uses an all-friction stir welded tank, the highest strength and most reliable welding technique available.

The Falcon 9 v1.0 first stage used a pyrophoric mixture of triethylaluminum-triethylborane (TEA-TEB) as a first-stage ignitor.

=== Second stage ===
The upper stage was powered by a single Merlin 1C engine modified for vacuum operation, with an expansion ratio of 117:1 and a nominal burn time of 345 seconds. For added reliability of restart, the engine has dual redundant pyrophoric igniters (TEA-TEB). The second stage tank of Falcon 9 is simply a shorter version of the first stage tank and uses most of the same tooling, material and manufacturing techniques. This saves money during vehicle production.

The Falcon 9 v1.0 interstage, which connects the upper and lower stage for Falcon 9, is a carbon fiber aluminum core composite structure. Reusable separation collets and a pneumatic pusher system separate the stages. The stage separation system had twelve attachment points (later reduced to just three in the v1.1 launcher).

=== Control ===
SpaceX uses multiple redundant flight computers in a fault-tolerant design. Each Merlin engine is controlled by three voting computers, each of which has two physical processors that constantly check each other. The software runs on Linux and is written in C++. For flexibility, commercial off-the-shelf parts and system-wide "radiation-tolerant" design are used instead of radiation-hardened parts.

Four Draco thrusters were to be used for at least the second revision of the Falcon 9 v1.0 rocket second-stage as a reaction control system. It is unknown whether Falcon 9 ever flew with these thrusters; the second revision of Falcon 9 v1.0 was replaced with the Falcon 9 v1.1, which used nitrogen cold gas thrusters. The thrusters were used to hold a stable attitude for payload separation or, as a non-standard service, were also designed to be used to spin up the stage and payload to a maximum of 5 rotations per minute (RPM), although none of the five flown missions had a payload requirement for this service.

== Development history ==
=== Funding ===
While SpaceX spent its own money to develop its first launch vehicle, the Falcon 1, the development of the Falcon 9 was accelerated by the purchase of several demonstration flights by NASA. This started with seed money from the Commercial Orbital Transportation Services (COTS) program in 2006. SpaceX was selected from more than twenty companies that submitted COTS proposals. Without the NASA money, development would have taken longer, Musk said.

The development costs for Falcon 9 v1.0 were approximately US$300 million, and NASA verified those costs. If some of the Falcon 1 development costs were included, since F1 development did contribute to Falcon 9 to some extent, then the total might be considered as high as US$390 million.

NASA also evaluated Falcon 9 development costs using the NASA‐Air Force Cost Model (NAFCOM)—a traditional cost-plus contract approach for US civilian and military space procurement—at US$$3.6 billion based on a NASA environment/culture, or US$$1.6 billion using a more commercial approach.

=== Production ===
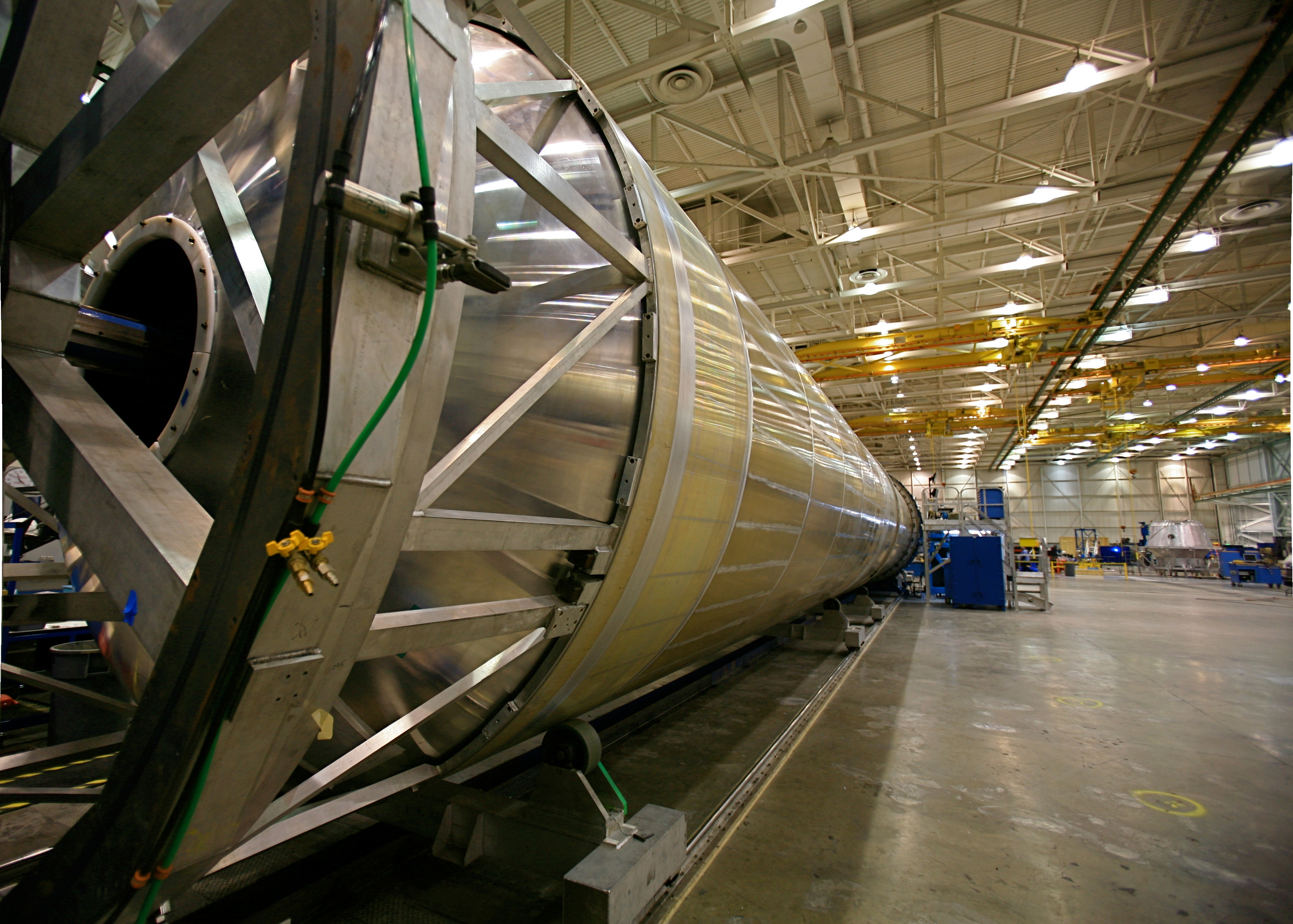
Falcon 9 booster tank at the SpaceX factory, 2008

In December 2010, the SpaceX production line was manufacturing one new Falcon 9 (and Dragon spacecraft) every three months, with a plan to double the production rate to one every six weeks in 2012.

== Launch history ==
The v1.0 version of Falcon 9 was launched five times, all successfully carrying a Dragon spacecraft to low-Earth orbit, of which three achieved docking with the International Space Station.

One of those missions deployed its secondary payload in a lower orbit than expected due to an engine failure and safety constraints imposed by the ISS primary mission.

== Reusability ==
Falcon 9 v1.0 (left) and v1.1 (right) engine configurations

SpaceX ran a limited set of post-mission booster recovery flight tests on the early Falcon rocket launches, both Falcon 1 and Falcon 9. The initial parachute-based design approach was ultimately unsuccessful, and the company adopted a new propulsive-return design methodology that would utilize the Falcon 9 v1.1 vehicle for orbital recovery testing, but did use a Falcon 9 v1.0 booster tank for low-altitude low-velocity flight testing in 2012–2013.

From early days in the development of the Falcon 9, SpaceX had expressed hopes that both stages would eventually be reusable. The initial SpaceX design for stage reusability included adding lightweight thermal protection system (TPS) capability to the booster stage and utilizing parachute recovery of the separated stage. However, early test results were not successful, leading to abandonment of that approach and the initiation of a new design.

In 2011 SpaceX began a formal and funded development program—the SpaceX reusable launch system development program—with the objective of designing reusable first and second stages utilizing propulsive return of the stages to the launch pad. The early program focus, however, is only on return of the first stage.

As an early component of that multi-year program, a Falcon 9 v1.0 first stage tank, 32 metres (106 ft) long, was used to build and test the Grasshopper prototype test vehicle, which made eight successful low-altitude takeoffs and vertical landings in 2012–2013 before the vehicle was retired.

== See also ==
- Falcon Heavy
- SpaceX launch vehicles
- SpaceX Dragon
- Comparison of orbital launch systems
