= Livingston L. Holder Jr. =

American astronaut (born 1956)

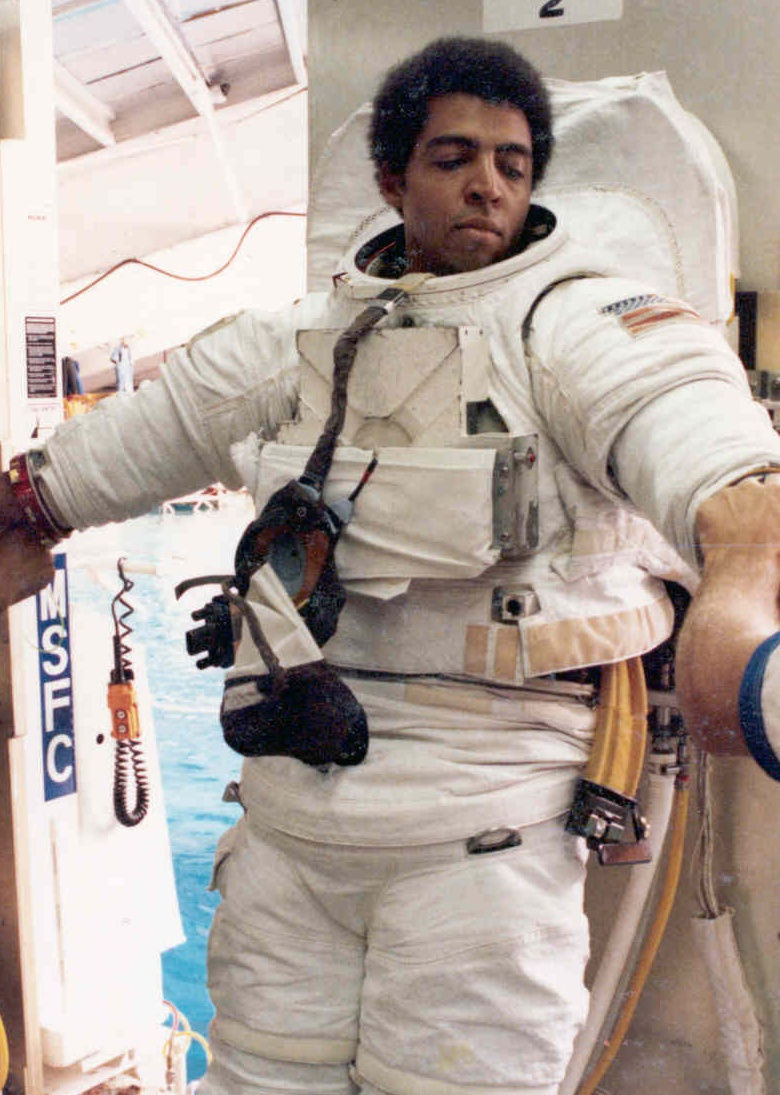
- Born: September 29, 1956 (age 70); Detroit, Michigan, US
- Occupation: Aerospace Engineer
- Space career

USAF astronaut
- Status: Co-founder and CTO of Radian Aerospace (presently)
- Rank: Captain, USAF
- Selection: 1982 USAF Group

Livingston L. Holder Jr. (born 29 September 1956) is a former USAF astronaut in the Manned Spaceflight Engineer Program during the mid-1980s. He was assigned to fly as a military payload specialist on the Space Shuttle, but could not fly in space due to the Challenger accident in 1986.

== Biography ==
Holder was born in Detroit, Michigan, United States and now resides in Seattle, Washington. He has three sons (Jonathan, Nathan, and Christopher). He holds a B.S. in Astronautical Engineering from the United States Air Force Academy, and an M.S. in Systems Management from University of Southern California. While serving in the Air Force, Holder was a Titan III launch crew member at Vandenberg AFB, California. He also worked in the Office of the Secretary of the Air Force, Special Projects organization, Los Angeles AFS, California, on a classified satellite program.

Holder trained and qualified as a Manned Spaceflight Engineer and Space Shuttle payload specialist from 1982 to 1988. He remains active in supporting youth education through the Space Foundation, most recently visiting Alaska schools to share his experiences.

Holder joined Boeing in 1988, where he was the manager of the aircraft and spacecraft segments of the RESOURCE21 Program. Later he managed the International Space Station (ISS) international integration activities with responsibility for the ISS Habitation Module. In 1994 he became the program manager for the Sea Launch program during initial development. He was Chief Engineer and Program Manager of Aviation Information Services (the precursor to Connexion by Boeing). From 1995 to 1996, Holder led Boeing's Future Space Transportation organizations, which included Boeing's participation in the X-33/Reusable Launch Vehicle Program.

Holder was the chairperson for COMSTAC at the US Department of Transportation from May 2000 until October 2003. In 2002, he joined Andrews Space as Vice President Space Systems, where he was responsible for the company's space system design, development, and new business activities. He led the company to its first DoD contracts on the Falcon program, a joint DARPA/USAF effort. He was also the manager for a joint effort between Northrop Grumman Corporation (NGC) and Andrews Space in the NASA funded 2nd Generation Reusable Launch Vehicle (RLV) program.

In 2006, Holder joined AirLaunch LLC (founded by space entrepreneur Gary Hudson) as Chief Program Executive. Under his leadership, AirLaunch achieved several technical milestones including the largest and heaviest object ever dropped from a C-17 and the largest and longest Vapor Pressurized rocket engine firings in history.

He then started Holder Aerospace, an engineering consulting company in partnership with Curtis Gifford, located in Renton, Washington. He is on the board of advisors for Space for Humanity.

As of 2016, Holder co-founded Radian Aerospace, a space company developing a single-stage-to-orbit spaceplane, the Radian One, and is its Chief Technology Officer.

== See also ==
- List of African-American astronauts
