= Lists of space programs =

A space program is an organized effort by a government or a company with a goal related to outer space.

Lists of space programs include:

- List of government space agencies
- List of private spaceflight companies
- List of human spaceflight programs
- List of space programs of the United States
- List of uncrewed spacecraft by program
