= SpaceX CRS-2 =

2013 American resupply spaceflight to the ISS

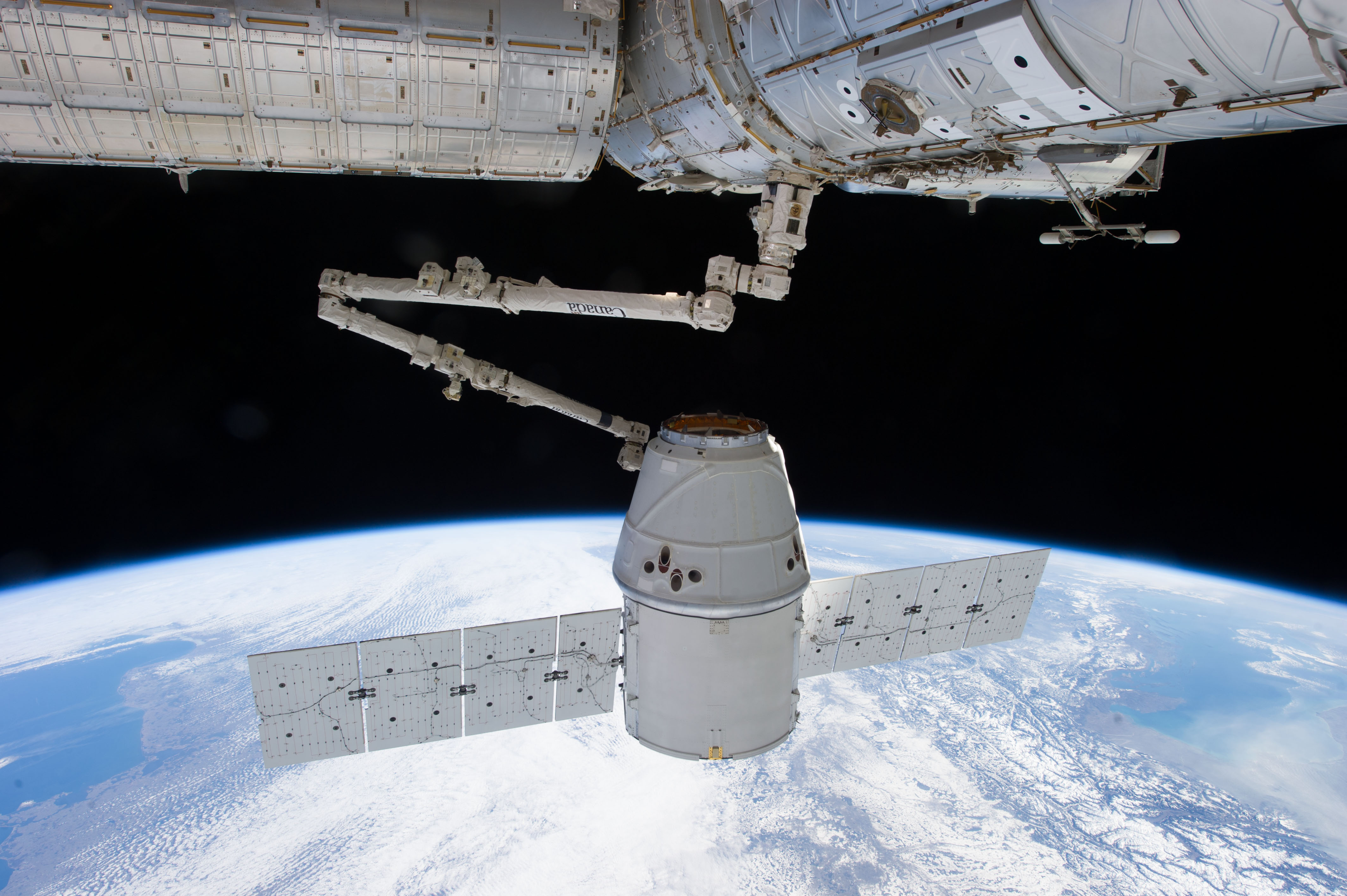
- The Dragon spacecraft being berthed to Harmony on 3 March 2013
- Names: SpX-2
- Mission type: ISS resupply
- Operator: SpaceX
- COSPAR ID: 2013-010A
- SATCAT no.: 39115
- Mission duration: 25 days, 1 hour, 24 minutes

Spacecraft properties
- Spacecraft: Dragon 1 C104
- Spacecraft type: Dragon 1
- Manufacturer: SpaceX
- Launch mass: 6,000 kg (13,000 lb)
- Dimensions: Height: 8.1 m (27 ft); Diameter:4 m (13 ft)

Start of mission
- Launch date: 1 March 2013, 15:10 UTC
- Rocket: Falcon 9 v1.0 (B0007)
- Launch site: Cape Canaveral, SLC‑40

End of mission
- Disposal: Recovered
- Landing date: 26 March 2013, 16:34 UTC
- Landing site: Pacific Ocean

Orbital parameters
- Reference system: Geocentric orbit
- Regime: Low Earth orbit
- Inclination: 51.6°

Berthing at ISS
- Berthing port: Harmony nadir
- RMS capture: 3 March 2013, 10:31 UTC
- Berthing date: 3 March 2013, 13:56 UTC
- Unberthing date: 26 March 2013, 08:10 UTC
- RMS release: 26 March 2013, 10:56 UTC
- Time berthed: 22 days, 18 hours, 14 minutes

Cargo
- Mass: 898 kg (1,980 lb)
- Pressurised: 677 kg (1,493 lb)
- Unpressurised: 221 kg (487 lb)
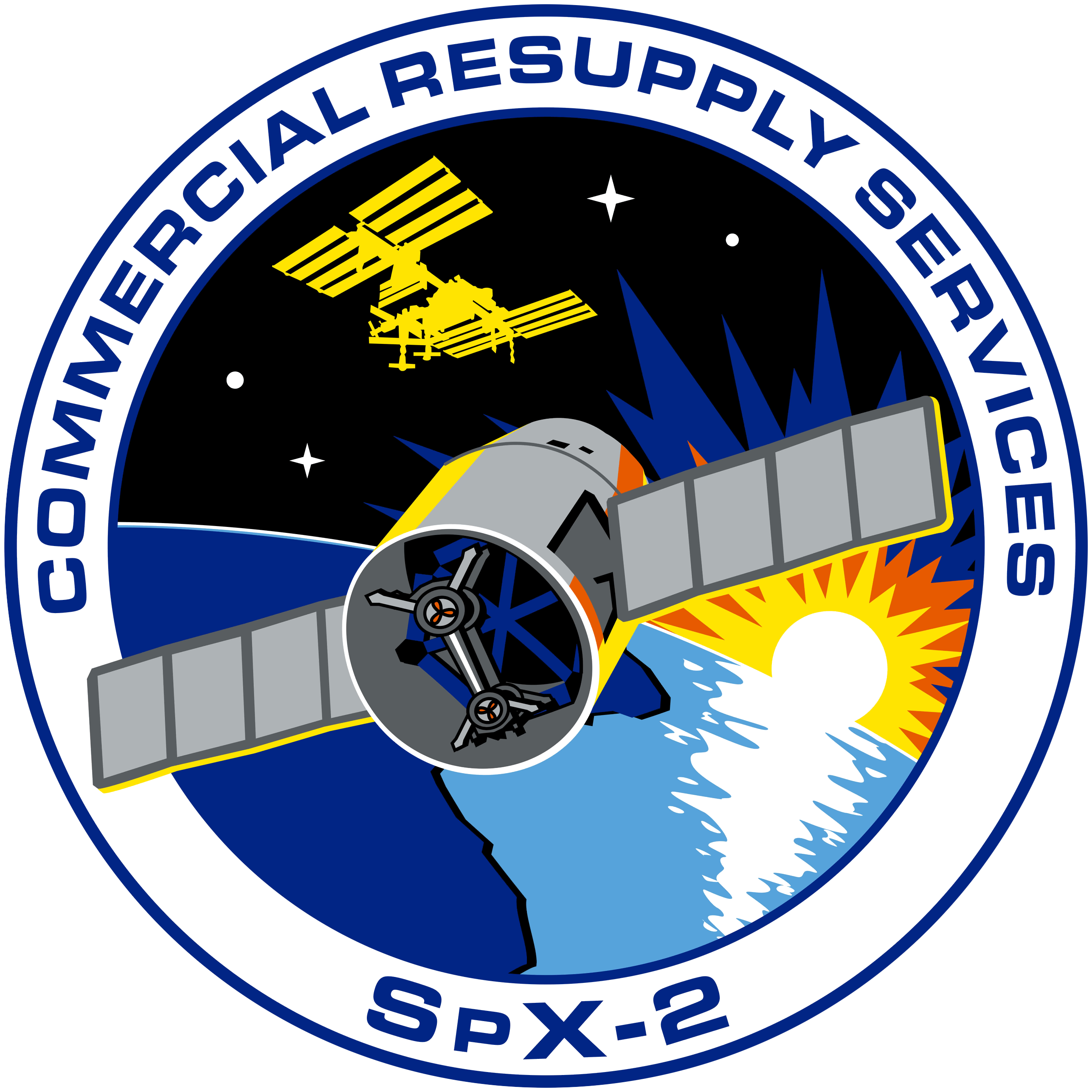
- NASA SpX-2 mission patch Commercial Resupply Services Cargo Dragon

SpaceX CRS-2, also known as SpX-2, was the fourth flight for SpaceX's uncrewed Dragon cargo spacecraft, the fifth and final flight for the company's two-stage Falcon 9 v1.0 launch vehicle, and the second SpaceX operational mission contracted to NASA under a Commercial Resupply Services (CRS-1) contract.

The launch occurred on 1 March 2013. A minor technical issue on the Dragon spacecraft involving the RCS thruster pods occurred upon reaching orbit, but it was recoverable. The vehicle was released from the station on 26 March 2013, at 10:56 UTC and splashed down in the Pacific Ocean at 16:34 UTC.

== History ==
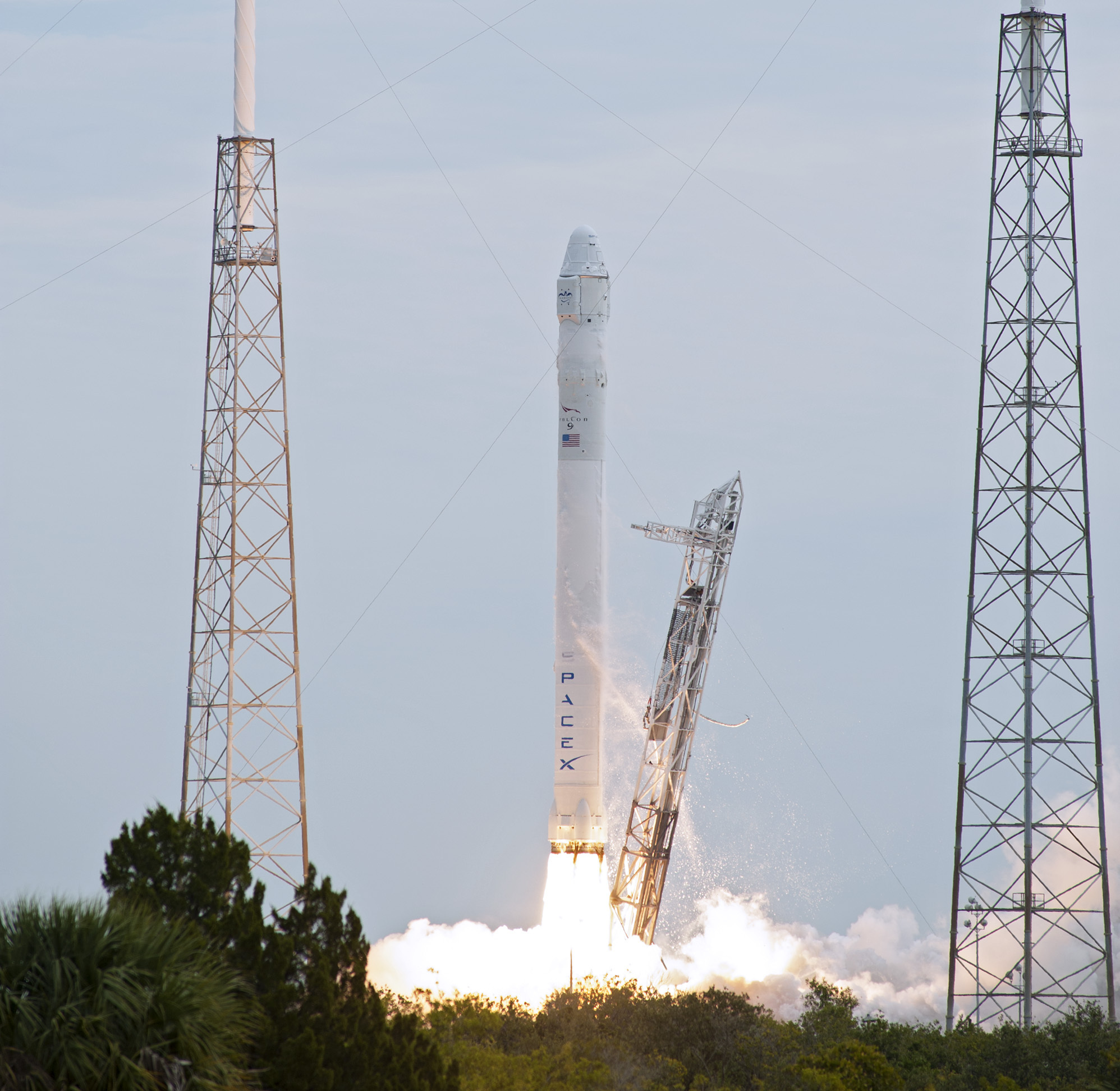
The SpaceX CRS-2 Falcon 9 launching on 1 March 2013

The planned shipment of the Falcon 9 first stage from Texas to the Florida launch site was delayed due to the ongoing investigation of the engine failure that occurred on the previous flight. In late November 2012, it was reported that the CRS-2 Falcon 9 had been transported to Cape Canaveral (CCAFS). A static fire test occurred for the CRS-2 Falcon 9 on 25 February 2013.

== Firsts ==
The Dragon unpressurized trunk section, which allows the transport of unpressurized cargo to the ISS, had its first use on this flight. This cargo consisted of two Heat Rejection Subsystem Grapple Fixtures (HRSGFs), which are essentially bars to be attached to the ISS radiators to allow for future movement work.

== Payload ==
When launched the CRS-2 Dragon was filled with about 677 kg (1,493 lb) of cargo, 575 kg (1,268 lb) without packaging. Included is 81 kg (179 lb) of crew supplies, 347 kg (765 lb) of scientific experiments and experiment hardware, 135 kg (298 lb) of hardware for the station and other miscellaneous items, among them a CD copy of the song "Up in the Air" by rock band Thirty Seconds to Mars, was premiered on board the International Space Station (ISS) on 18 March 2013, during a NASA TV broadcast from the station. The two Heat Rejection Subsystem Grapple Fixtures (HRSGFs) had a combined weight of 221 kg (487 lb) and were transported to the ISS inside the unpressurized Dragon trunk as external cargo.

The Dragon returned 1,370 kg (3,020 lb) of cargo, 1,210 kg (2,670 lb) without packaging. Included is 95 kg (209 lb) of crew supplies, 660 kg (1,460 lb) of scientific experiments and experiment hardware, 401 kg (884 lb) of space station hardware, 38 kg (84 lb) of spacesuit equipment and other miscellaneous items.

== Dragon thruster pods anomaly ==
Shortly after second stage separation, at 15:45 UTC on 1 March 2013, the Dragon spacecraft encountered technical problems involving its propulsion system. "When priming its four Draco Thruster Pods, the vehicle detected insufficient pressurization on the oxidizer (Nitrogen Tetroxide) system" of three of the pods, which "caused the Flight Computers to place the vehicle in Passive Abort Mode". In this mode, Dragon is not executing any more orbital operations. Its thruster system was disabled, and the solar panels were not deployed since the vehicle had not achieved its proper solar panel deployment attitude. "Dragon is programmed not to open its solar panels outside its proper attitude configuration to avoid contact with the second stage. This rule is in place for scenarios in which Dragon is not properly separated from the Falcon 9 booster. As time progressed, teams working at SpaceX Mission Control, MCC-X in Hawthorne, California, started assessments of the issue". During the early minutes and hours of the mission, the mission progress news came in bits, some of it over social media. An update from Elon Musk on Twitter clarified the following:

Issue with Dragon thruster pods. System inhibiting three of four from initializing. About to command inhibit override.

At 16:12 UTC, Elon Musk announced that a "command inhibit override" would be issued as the Dragon module was "about to pass over the Australia ground station". Initially solar panel deployment was held "until at least two thruster pods are active". SpaceX Mission Control decided to proceed with solar deployment due to array temperatures while the spacecraft was not in active attitude control at 16:40 UTC: "Thruster pod 3 tank pressure trending positive. Preparing to deploy solar arrays". At 16:50 UTC, solar arrays had successfully been deployed on the Dragon spacecraft. Three of the four thruster pods on the Dragon spacecraft must be operational for berthing to be allowed with the International Space Station. After making corrections, SpaceX regained control of all four thruster pods and would be able to correct its course to the ISS. According to Elon Musk, "All systems green". NASA officials said that the spacecraft would not rendezvous with the ISS on 2 March 2013 as was originally planned. It would instead rendezvous on 3 March 2013. Dragon was grappled with by Canadarm2 by NASA Expedition 34 commander Kevin Ford and NASA flight engineer Tom Marshburn at 10:31 UTC on 3 March 2013 and was berthed to the nadir (Earth-facing) docking port of the Harmony module at 13:56 UTC.

== Remainder of mission (3 to 26 March 2013) ==
On 6 March 2013, the space station's Canadarm2 removed the grapple bars from Dragon's trunk. This event marked the first delivery of unpressurized cargo from a commercial spacecraft to the ISS. The spacecraft's return to Earth was postponed to 26 March 2013 from its originally scheduled date of 25 March 2013 due to inclement weather developing near its targeted splashdown site in the Pacific Ocean. The additional day spent attached to the orbiting laboratory did not affect science samples scheduled to return aboard the spacecraft.

On 26 March 2013, Dragon was unberthed from the Harmony node by the Canadarm2 at 08:10 UTC by commands from ground controllers. Its release from Canadarm2 occurred at 10:56 UTC; the Expedition 35 crew then commanded the spacecraft to slowly depart from the International Space Station. The SpaceX Dragon fired its engines for the last time at 15:42 UTC sending it through the atmosphere of Earth for a splashdown in the Pacific Ocean at 16:34 UTC. A team of SpaceX engineers, technicians, and divers recovered the vehicle and its scientific cargo off the coast of Baja California for the journey back to shore, which took about 30 hours.

== Gallery ==
SpaceX CRS-2
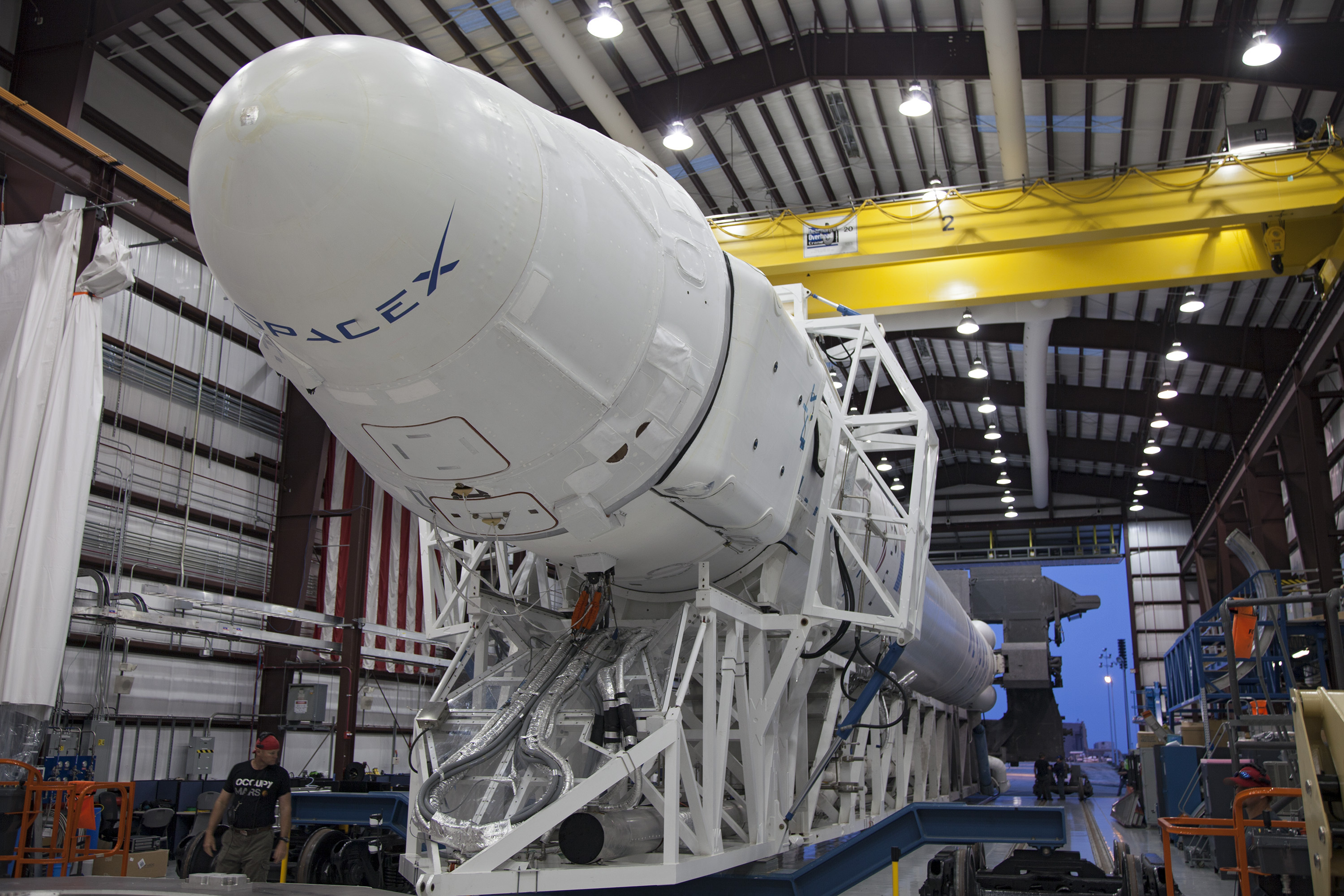
Dragon before rollout

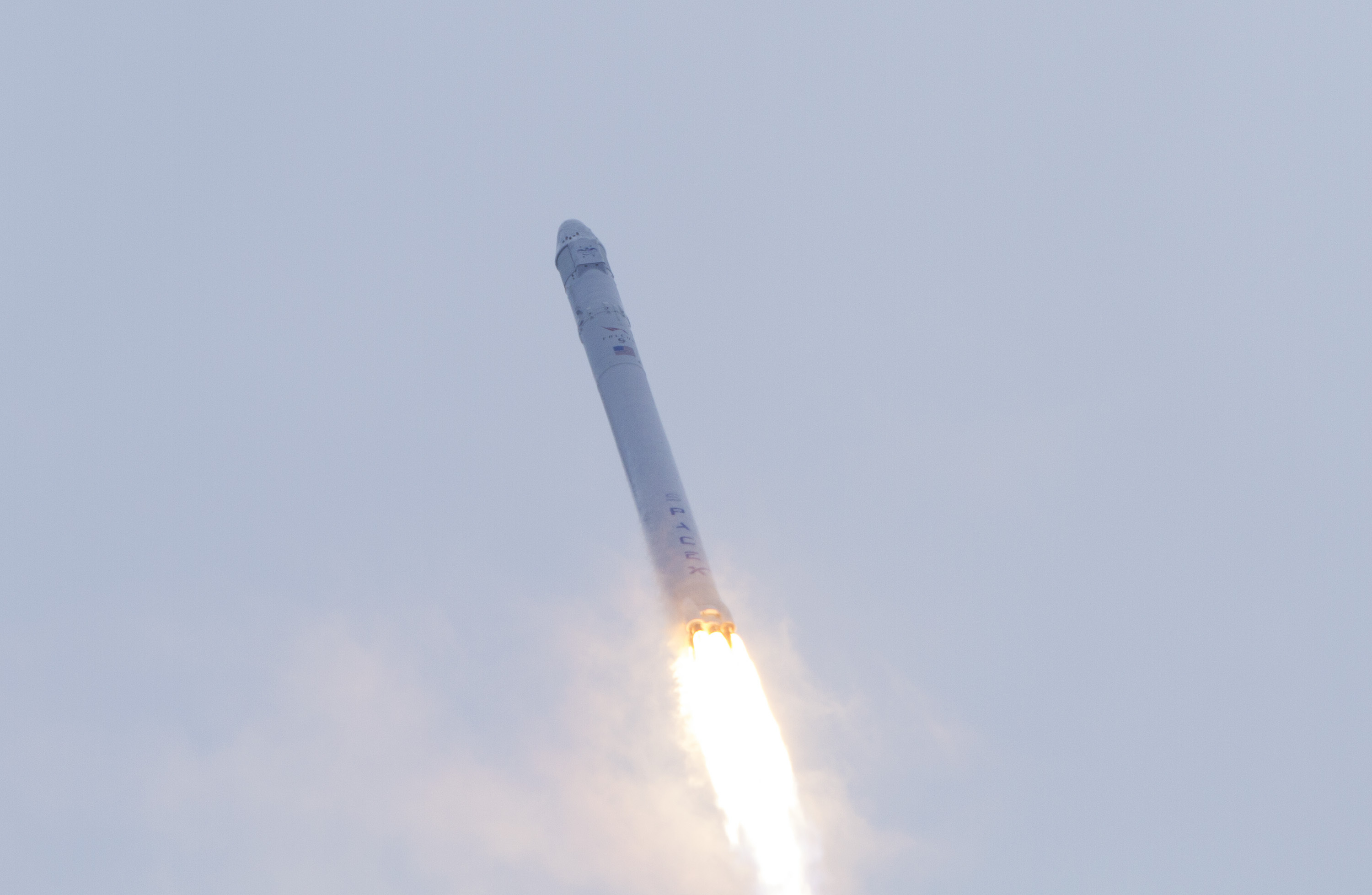
Launch of CRS-2

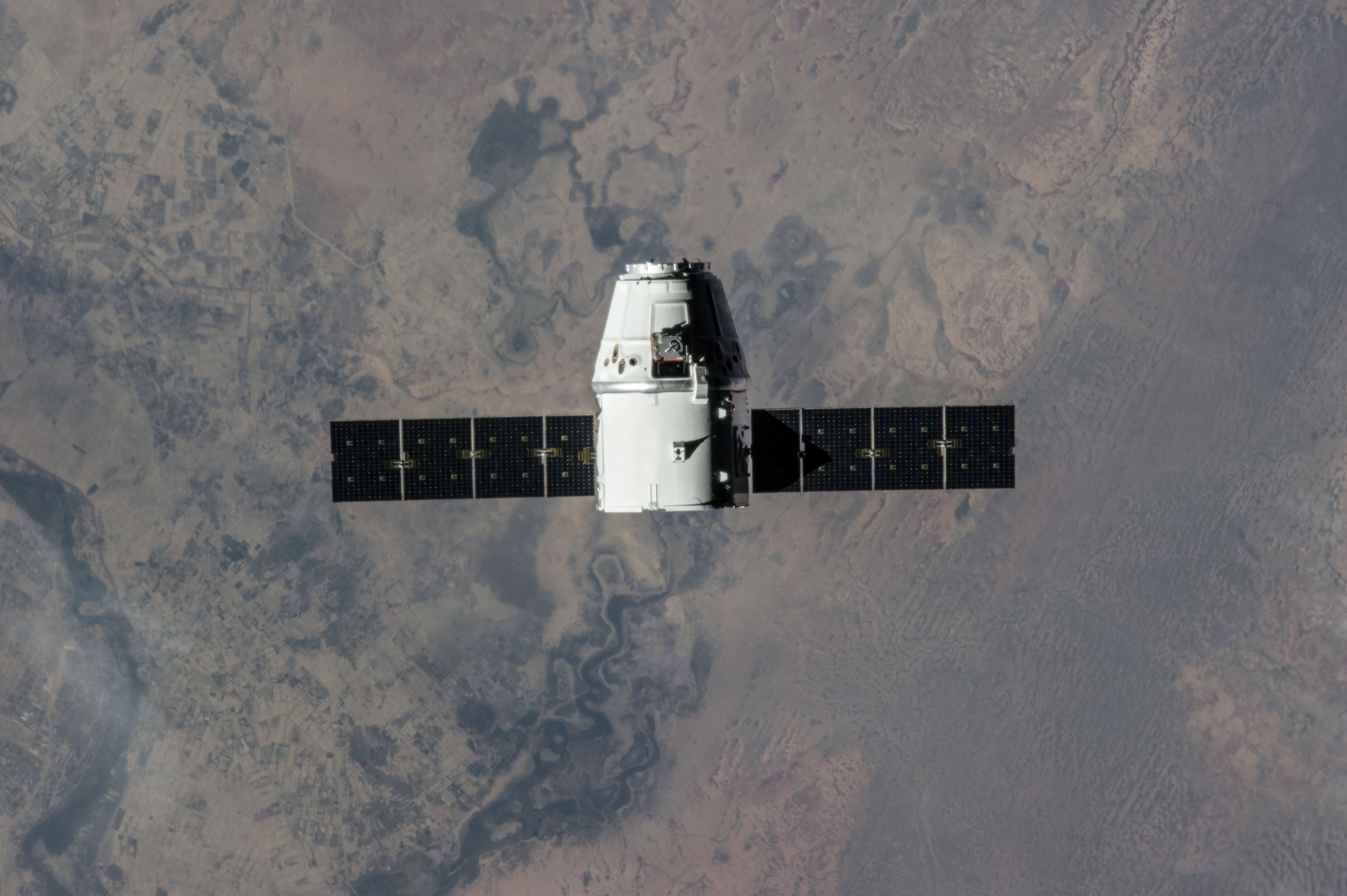
Dragon approaching the ISS

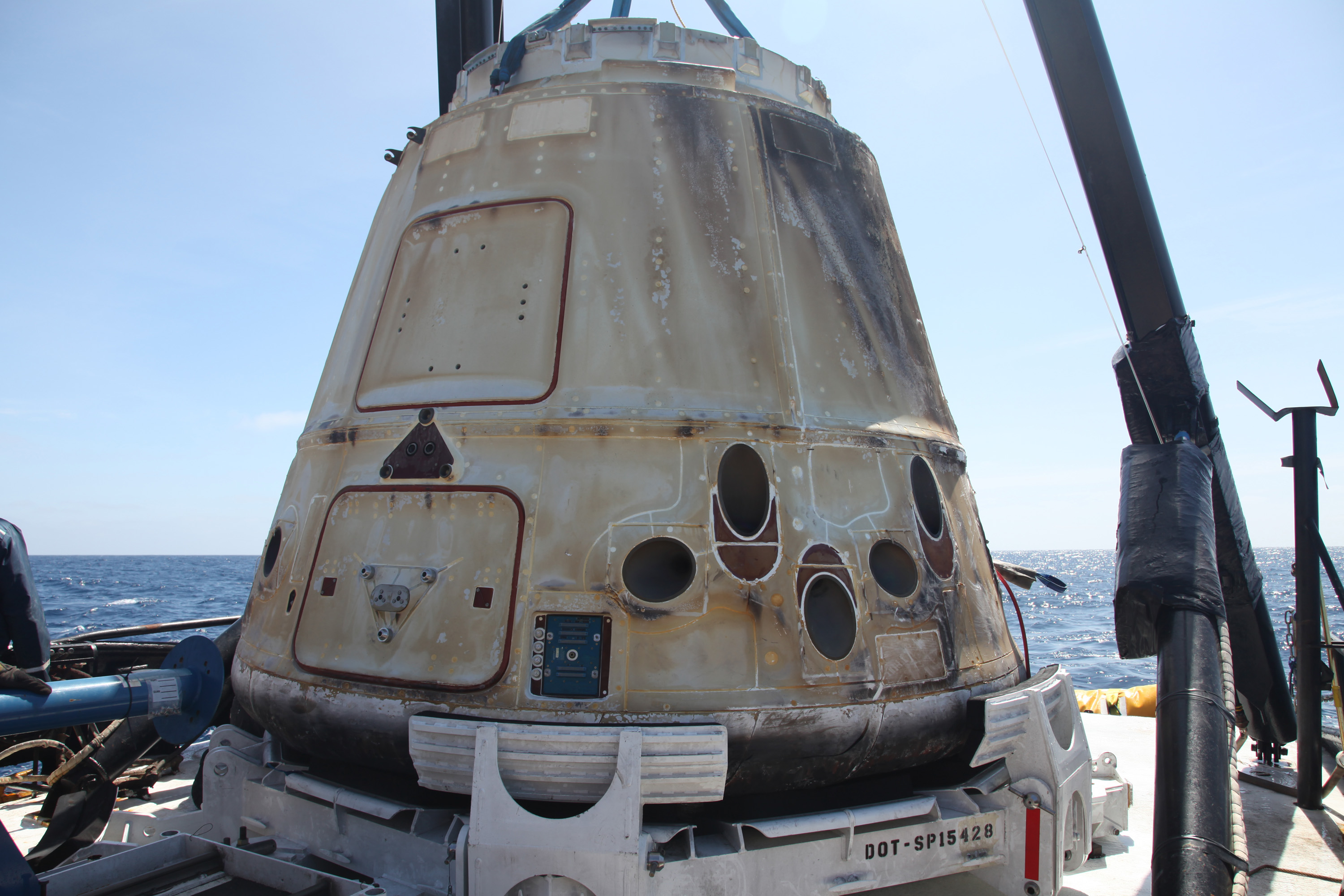
Dragon after reentry and splashdown

== See also ==
- List of Falcon 9 launches
