= Radian Aerospace =

American aerospace company

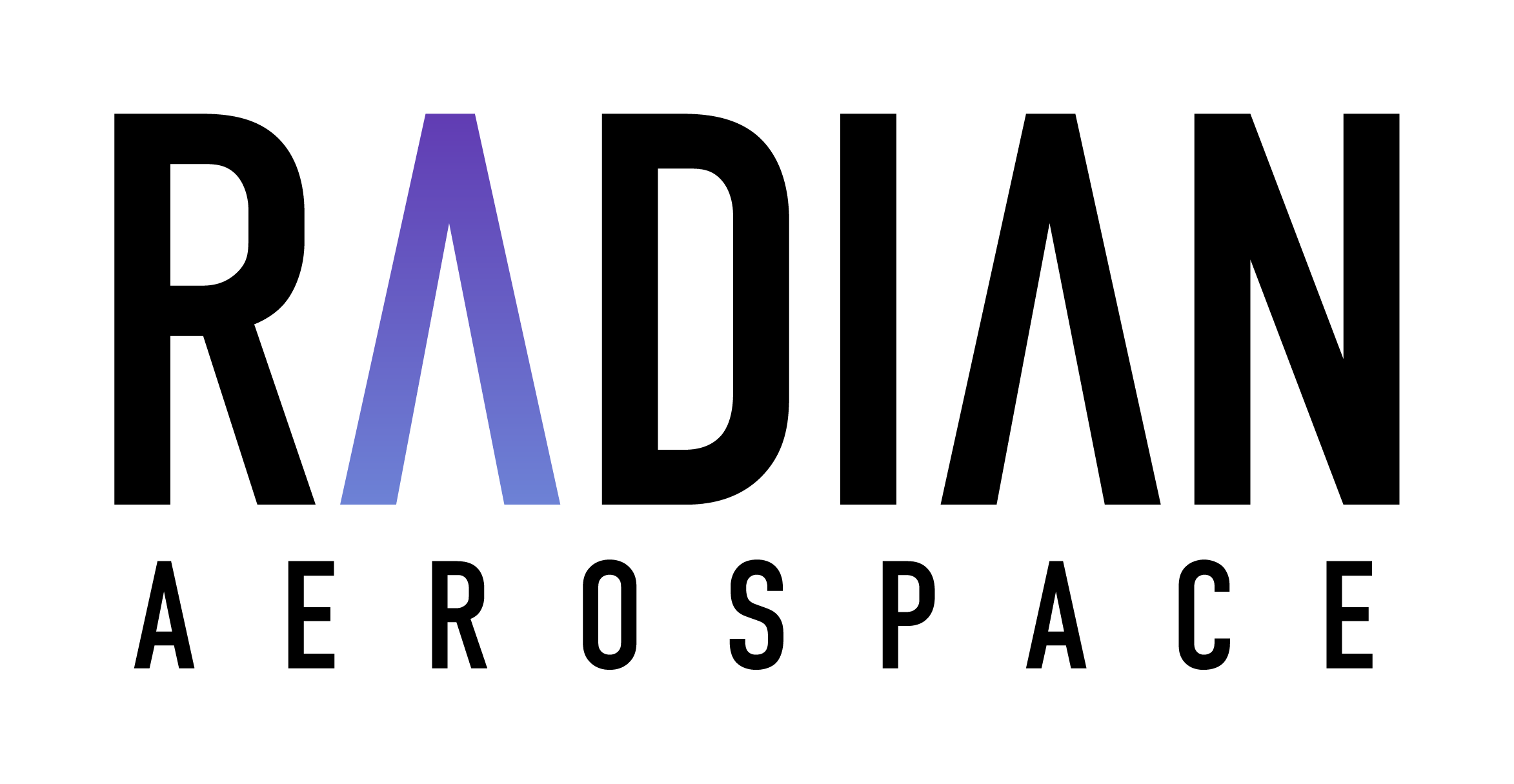
- Type: Private incorporated company
- Industry: Aerospace
- Founded: 2016; 10 years ago
- Founder: Richard Humphrey, Livingston L. Holder Jr., Jeff Feige, Curtis Gifford
- Headquarters: Seattle, Washington
- Website: radianaerospace.com

Radian Aerospace is an American aerospace company based in Seattle, Washington. The company is developing a horizontal take-off/horizontal landing, single-stage-to-orbit, fully reusable spaceplane concept called Radian One.

== History ==
Radian was founded in 2016. In January 2022, the company closed a $27.5 million seed round led by venture capital fund Fine Structure Ventures.

In September 2024, Radian Aerospace completed ground tests of its subscale prototype flight vehicle called PFV01 in Abu Dhabi and begins flight tests.

== Radian One ==
Radian released their latest vehicle design of Radian One to the public in April 2024. Radian One is designed to carry up to five crew members to low Earth orbit, with as much as 5,000 pounds of payload going up and 10,000 pounds going down. The delta-winged plane will be launched from a rocket-powered sled. Radian claims it will be able to land on any 10,000 ft (3,000 m) runway and fly again in 48 hours.

== Target markets ==
The company is focusing on research, space manufacturing, terrestrial observation, and rapid global delivery to Earth destinations. Radian has penned launch agreements with governments and commercial firms.

== See also ==
- Commercialization of space
- Private spaceflight
