= Dragon Spacecraft Qualification Unit =

Test version of SpaceX spacecraft

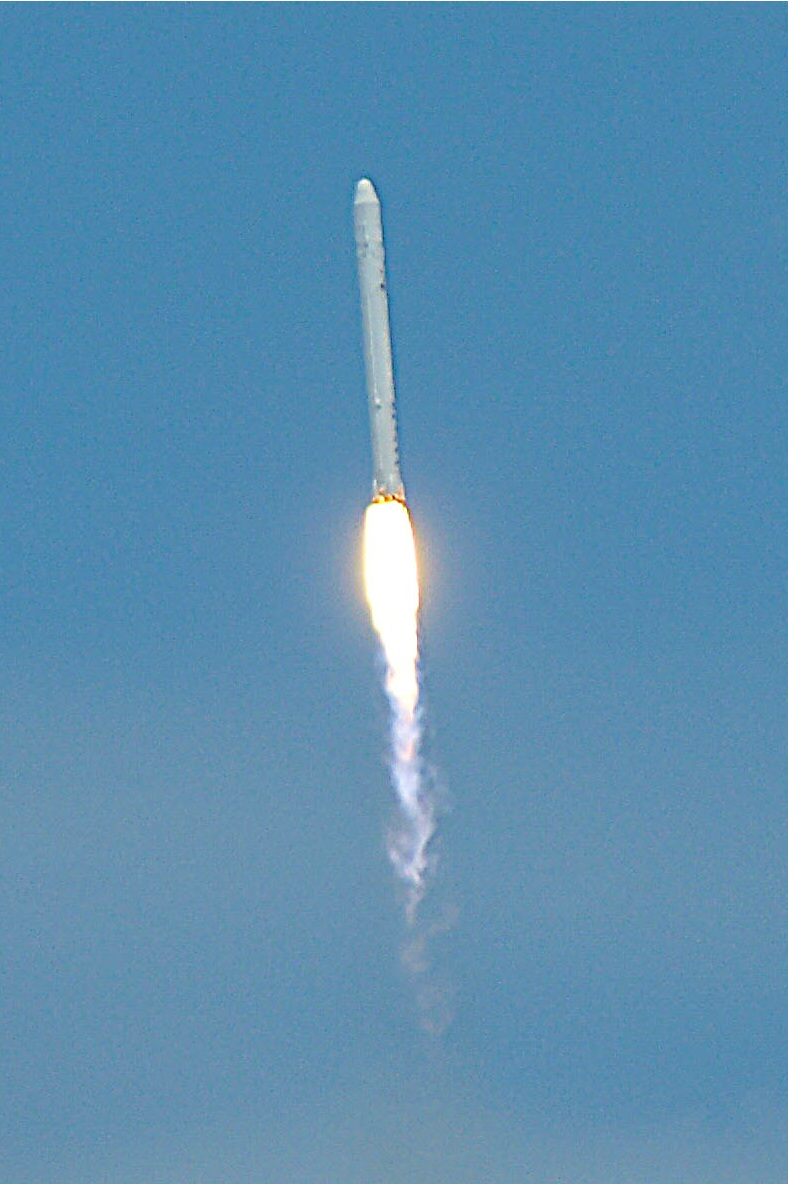
- The Dragon boilerplate launches aboard Falcon 9 Flight 1, June 4, 2010
- Mission type: Technology demonstration
- Operator: SpaceX
- COSPAR ID: 2010-026A
- SATCAT no.: 36595
- Mission duration: 22 days, 6 hours and 5 minutes
- Orbits completed: 359

Spacecraft properties
- Manufacturer: SpaceX

Start of mission
- Launch date: 4 June 2010, 18:45 UTC
- Rocket: Falcon 9 v1.0 (B0003)
- Launch site: Cape Canaveral, SLC‑40

End of mission
- Reentry: 27 June 2010, 00:50 UTC

Orbital parameters
- Reference system: Geocentric orbit
- Regime: Low Earth orbit
- Perigee altitude: 249.5 km (155.0 mi)
- Apogee altitude: 252.5 km (156.9 mi)
- Inclination: 34.5°
- Epoch: 26 June 2010, 22:58:50
- Commercial Orbital Transportation Services

The Dragon Spacecraft Qualification Unit was a boilerplate version of the Dragon spacecraft manufactured by SpaceX. After using it for ground tests to rate Dragon's shape and mass in various tests, SpaceX launched it into low Earth orbit on the maiden flight of the Falcon 9 rocket, on June 4, 2010. SpaceX used the launch to evaluate the aerodynamic conditions on the spacecraft and performance of the carrier rocket in a real-world launch scenario, ahead of Dragon flights for NASA under the Commercial Orbital Transportation Services program. The spacecraft orbited the Earth over 300 times before decaying from orbit and reentering the atmosphere on 27 June.

== Delays ==
In September 2009, the launch was slated to occur no earlier than November 29, 2009, however the launch was subsequently postponed ten more times, to launch dates in February, March, April, May, and June 2010, for multiple reasons including finding an open launch date, approvals, and retesting. The launch date was eventually set for June 4, 2010.

== Processing ==
On October 16, 2009, nine Merlin 1C engines of the first stage of the Falcon 9 rocket intended to launch the Dragon were test fired at SpaceX's rocket engine test facility in McGregor, Texas. On January 2, 2010, the second stage of the Falcon 9 vehicle was test fired for the full duration required for orbital insertion, 345 seconds. By late February, the launch vehicle had been assembled and raised to its vertical position on the launch pad at Cape Canaveral Air Force Station Space Launch Complex 40 (SLC-40), having been rolled out to the launch pad on February 19.

On March 13, 2010, the first stage engines successfully underwent a 3.5 second static test firing, having failed a previous attempt the day before.

== Launch ==
SpaceX announced in September 2009 that the Dragon Spacecraft Qualification Unit would be the payload for the first Falcon 9 launch. At the time, launch was scheduled to occur no earlier than November 2009. The launch date had been delayed several times for various reasons, The spacecraft was launched and entered orbit on June 4, 2010.

The first actual launch attempt targeted a four-hour launch window opening at 15:00 UTC (11 a.m. EDT) on 4 June 2010, with the possibility of a launch attempt the following day in the event that launch did not occur inside the 4 June window. The first attempt to launch the rocket, at 17:30 UTC, was aborted seconds prior to liftoff due to a reported out of range engine parameter, which later turned out to be a sensor error. The launch was rescheduled, with a successful liftoff taking place an hour and fifteen minutes later at 18:45 UTC (2:45 pm EDT). The vehicle reached orbit successfully, entering into a 250 km (160 mi) orbit.

Launch video (1 min 52 s)

SpaceX employee Ken Bowersox stated that the rocket experienced "a little bit of roll at liftoff". This roll had stopped prior to the craft reaching the top of the lightning towers. A separate issue involved a moderate, uncorrected roll at the end of the second stage firing. The first stage, that is designed to be reusable, disintegrated during reentry, before the parachutes could be deployed.

== Orbit ==
Following the launch, SpaceX left the qualification unit in low Earth orbit, where its orbit was allowed to decay and it reentered the atmosphere around 00:50 GMT on June 27, 2010. The qualification unit remained attached to the second stage of the launcher; production units separate for orbital maneuvering.

SpaceX lost contact with the Dragon and the Falcon 9 second stage shortly after orbit was achieved, as the on-board batteries were only designed to last long enough to launch. They re-entered in the early morning hours (UTC) on June 27, 2010. Although exact location is uncertain, it is believed to have disintegrated over Syria and Iraq.

== UFO sightings ==
Places in Australia where the vehicle was seen

At around 5:30 am local time on June 5, 2010, sightings of a mysterious "lollipop-type swirl" light or cloud heading from west to east were reported in the Australian states of New South Wales and Queensland, as well as the Australian Capital Territory. The sightings were likened to the Russian RSM-56 Bulava rocket launch that prompted similar video and images from the Arctic known as the 2009 Norwegian spiral anomaly; it was suggested that the visible object was the spent upper stage or the qualification unit launched aboard the Falcon 9 or both.

== See also ==
- 2010 in spaceflight
- Cygnus (spacecraft) – Uncrewed cargo spacecraft developed by Orbital Sciences
- List of Falcon 9 and Falcon Heavy launches
- Ratsat – Mass simulator on fourth Falcon 1 flight
