= SpaceX CRS-1 =

2012 American resupply spaceflight to the ISS

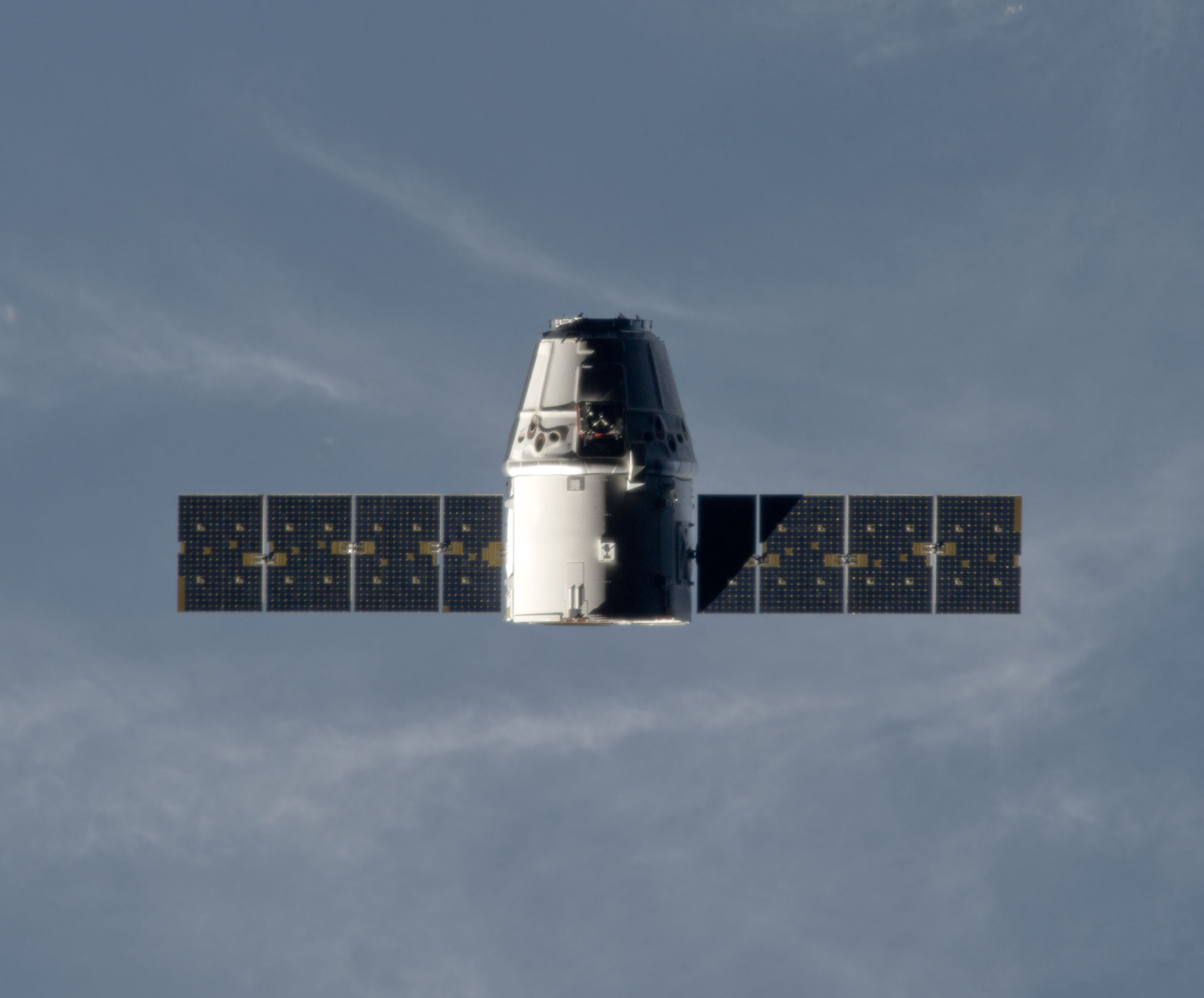
- Dragon 1 C103 is seen approaching the ISS
- Names: SpX-1
- Mission type: ISS resupply
- Operator: SpaceX
- COSPAR ID: 2012-054A
- SATCAT no.: 38846
- Mission duration: 20 days, 18 hours, 47 minutes

Spacecraft properties
- Spacecraft: Dragon 1 C103
- Spacecraft type: Dragon 1
- Manufacturer: SpaceX
- Launch mass: 6,000 kg (13,000 lb)
- Payload mass: 905 kg (1,995 lb)

Start of mission
- Launch date: 8 October 2012, 00:34:07 UTC
- Rocket: Falcon 9 v1.0 (B0006)
- Launch site: Cape Canaveral, SLC‑40

End of mission
- Disposal: Recovered
- Landing date: 28 October 2012, 19:22 UTC
- Landing site: Pacific Ocean

Orbital parameters
- Reference system: Geocentric orbit
- Regime: Low Earth orbit
- Inclination: 51.6°

Berthing at International Space Station
- Berthing port: Harmony
- RMS capture: 10 October 2012, 10:56 UTC
- Berthing date: 10 October 2012, 13:03 UTC
- Unberthing date: 28 October 2012, 11:19 UTC
- RMS release: 28 October 2012, 13:29 UTC
- Time berthed: 17 days 22 hours 16 minutes

Cargo
- Mass: 905 kg (1,995 lb)
- Pressurised: 905 kg (1,995 lb)
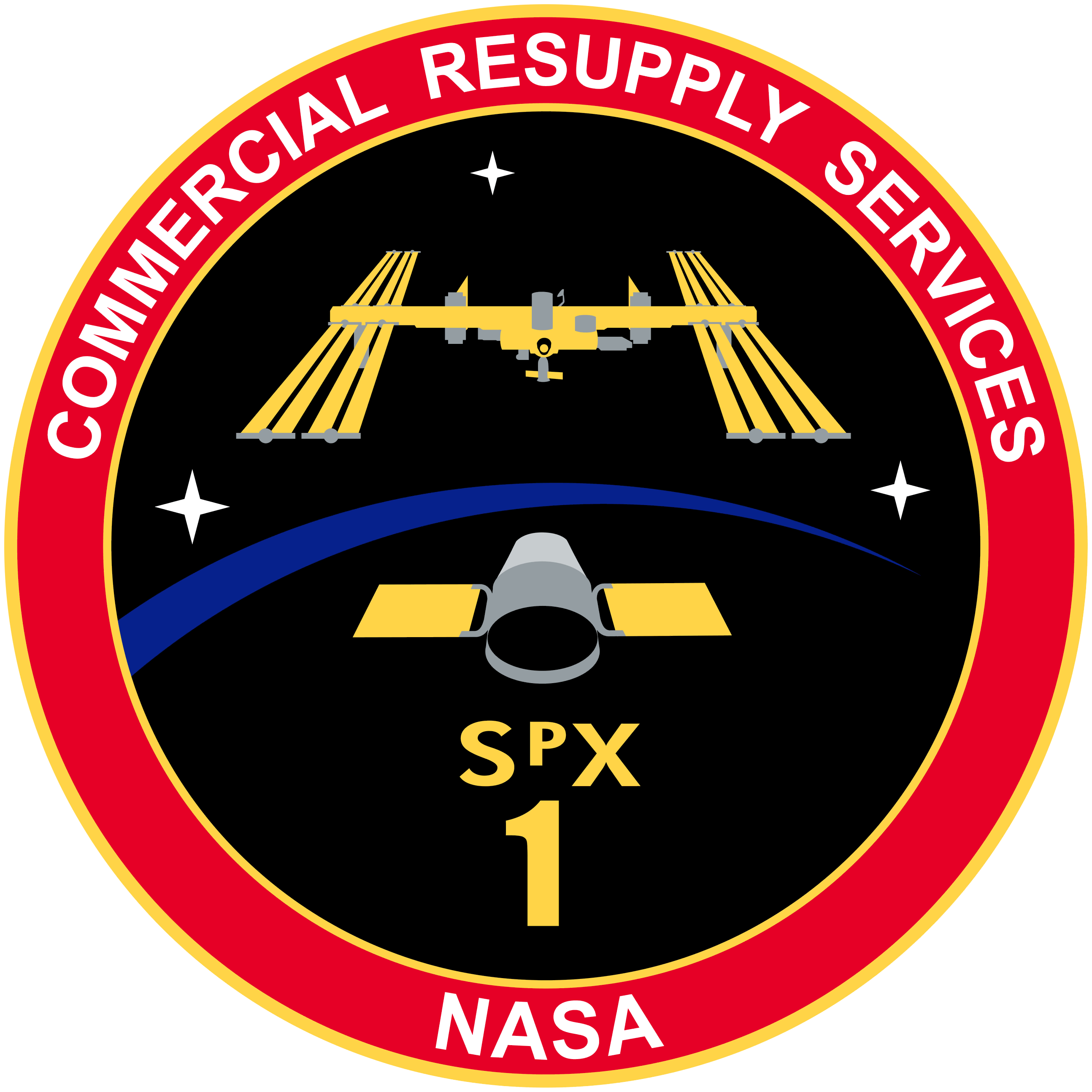
- NASA SpX-1 mission patch Commercial Resupply Services Cargo Dragon

SpaceX CRS-1, also known as SpX-1, was SpaceX's first operational cargo mission to the International Space Station, under their Commercial Resupply Services (CRS-1) contract with NASA. It was the third flight for the uncrewed Dragon cargo spacecraft, and the fourth overall flight for the company's two-stage Falcon 9 launch vehicle. The launch occurred on 8 October 2012 at 00:34:07 UTC.

== History ==
In May 2012, it was reported that the Falcon 9 had been transported to Cape Canaveral (CCAFS). The Dragon CRS-1 arrived on 14 August 2012. On 31 August 2012, a wet dress rehearsal (WDR) was completed for the Falcon 9, and on 29 September 2012, a static fire test was completed; both of these tests were completed without the Dragon capsule attached to the launch vehicle stack. The mission passed its Launch Readiness Review (LRR) on 5 October 2012.

The launch occurred on 8 October 2012 at 00:34:07 UTC and successfully placed the Dragon spacecraft into the proper orbit for arriving at the International Space Station with cargo resupply several days later. During the launch, one of the nine engines suffered a sudden loss of pressure 79 seconds into the flight, and an immediate early shutdown of that engine occurred; debris could be seen in the telescopic video of the night launch. The remaining eight engines fired for a longer period of time and the flight control software adjusted the trajectory to insert Dragon into a near-flawless orbit.

== Mission timeline ==
=== Flight day 1, launch (8 October 2012) ===
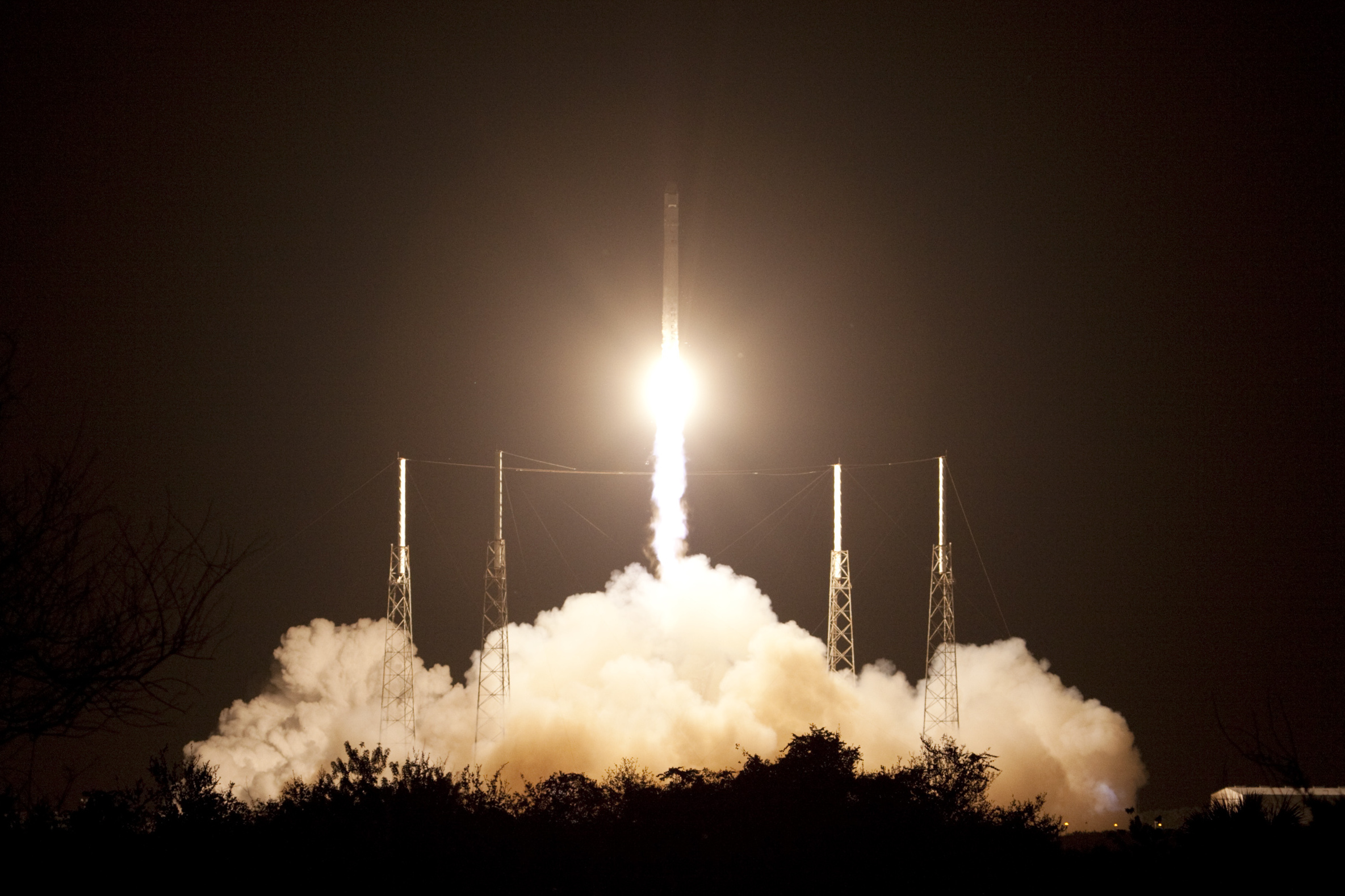
The SpaceX CRS-1 Falcon 9 launches on 8 October 2012.

The mission plan, as published by NASA before the mission, called for the Falcon 9 to reach supersonic speed at 70 seconds after liftoff, and pass through the area of maximum aerodynamic pressure, "max Q" — the point when mechanical stress on the launch vehicle peaks due to a combination of the velocity and resistance created by the Atmosphere of Earth — 10 seconds later. The plan called for two of the first-stage engines to shut down to reduce the launch vehicle's acceleration at approximately 2 minutes 30 seconds into the flight when the Falcon 9 would nominally be 90 km (56 mi) high and traveling at 10 times the speed of sound. The remaining engines were planned to cut off shortly after — an event known as main-engine cutoff (MECO). Five seconds after MECO, the first and second stages separate. Seven seconds later, the second stage's single Merlin vacuum engine was projected to ignite to begin a 6-minute, 14-second burn to put Dragon into low Earth orbit. Forty seconds after second-stage ignition, Dragon's protective nose cone, which covers Dragon's berthing mechanism, was planned to be jettisoned. At the 9-minute 14-second mark after launch, the second-stage engine was scheduled to cut off (SECO). Thirty-five seconds later, Dragon was planned to separate from Falcon 9's second stage and reach its preliminary orbit. The dragon would, per plan, then deploy its solar panels and open its guidance and navigation control (GNC) bay door which holds the sensors necessary for rendezvous and Dragon's grapple fixture.

=== Flight day 2 (9 October) ===
The mission plan called for the Dragon spacecraft to perform a coelliptic burn that would place it in a circular coelliptic orbit.

=== Flight day 3 (10 October) ===
As Dragon chased the International Space Station (ISS), the spacecraft established Ultra high frequency (UHF) communications using its COTS Ultra-high-frequency Communication Unit (CUCU). Also, using the crew command panel (CCP) on board the station, the expedition crew monitored the approach. This ability for the crew to send commands to Dragon is important during the rendezvous and departure phases of the mission.

During the final approach to the station, a go/no-go was performed by Mission Control Houston and the SpaceX team in Hawthorne to allow Dragon to perform another engine burn that brought it 250 m (820 ft) from the station. At this distance, Dragon began using its close-range guidance systems, composed of LIDAR and thermal imagers. These systems confirmed that Dragon's position and velocity are accurate by comparing the LIDAR image that Dragon receives against Dragon's thermal imagers. The Dragon flight control team in Hawthorne, with assistance from the NASA flight control team at the Johnson Space Center's International Space Station Flight Control Room, commanded the spacecraft to approach the station from its hold position. After another go/no-go was performed by the Houston and Hawthorne teams, Dragon was permitted to enter the Keep-Out Sphere (KOS), an imaginary sphere drawn 200 m (660 ft) around the station that reduces the risk of collision. Dragon proceeded to a position 30 m (98 ft) from the station and was automatically held. Another go/no-go was completed. Then Dragon proceeded to the 10 m (33 ft) position — the capture point. A final go/no-go was performed, and the Mission Control Houston team notified the crew they were go for the capture of Dragon.

At that point, Expedition 33 crewmember Akihiko Hoshide of the Japan Aerospace Exploration Agency used the station's 17.6 m (58 ft) robotic arm, known as Canadarm2, reached for and grappled the Dragon spacecraft at 10:56 UTC. Hoshide, with the help of Expedition 33 Commander Sunita Williams of NASA, guided Dragon to the Earth-facing side of the station's Harmony module. Williams and Hoshide swapped places and Williams gently berthed Dragon to Harmony's Common Berthing Mechanism at 13:03 UTC. The opening of the hatch between Dragon and the Harmony module, which was originally not scheduled to occur until 11 October 2012, was moved up and occurred at 17:40 UTC.

=== Remainder of mission (11 to 28 October) ===
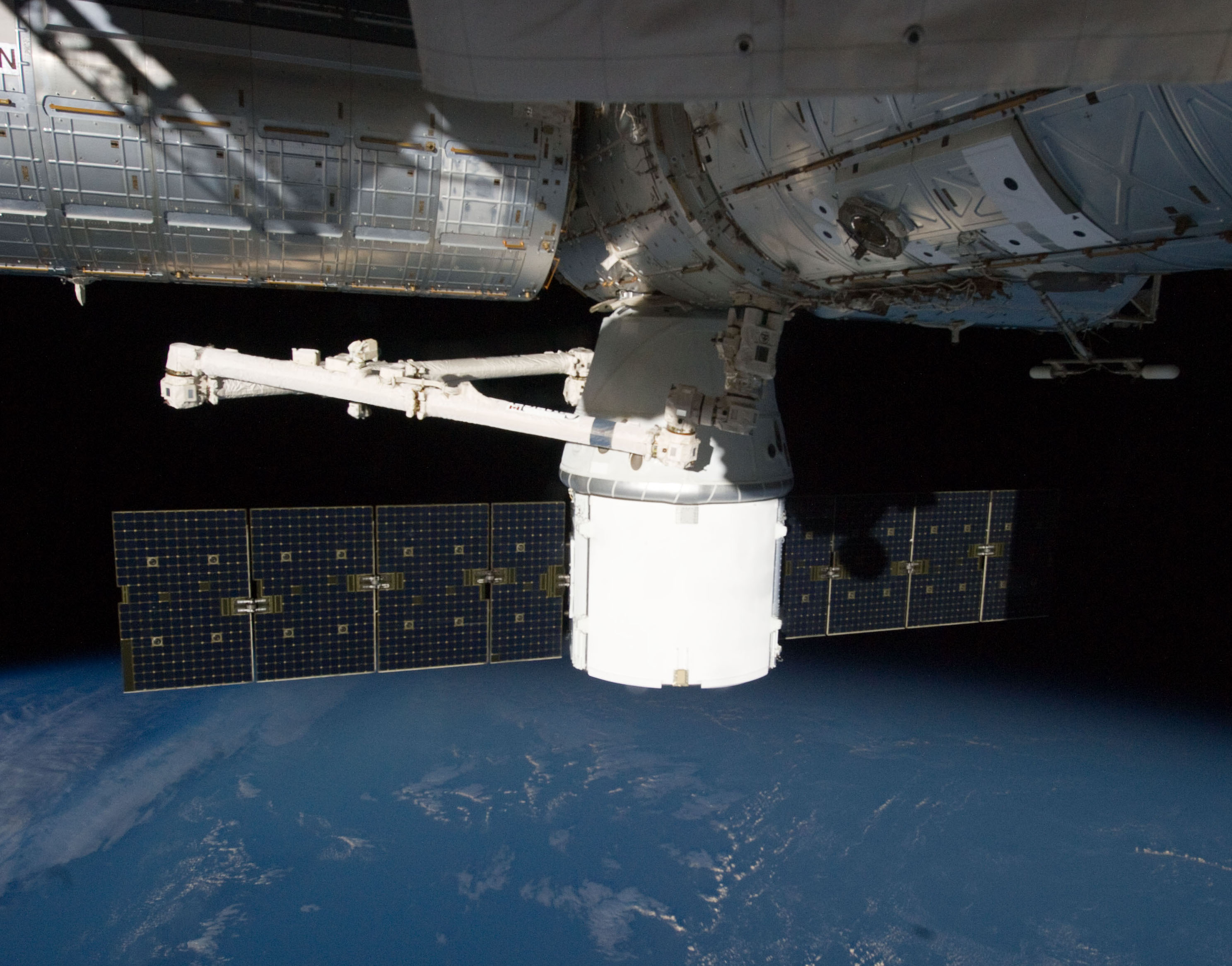
A Dragon as seen from Cupola on 14 October 2012

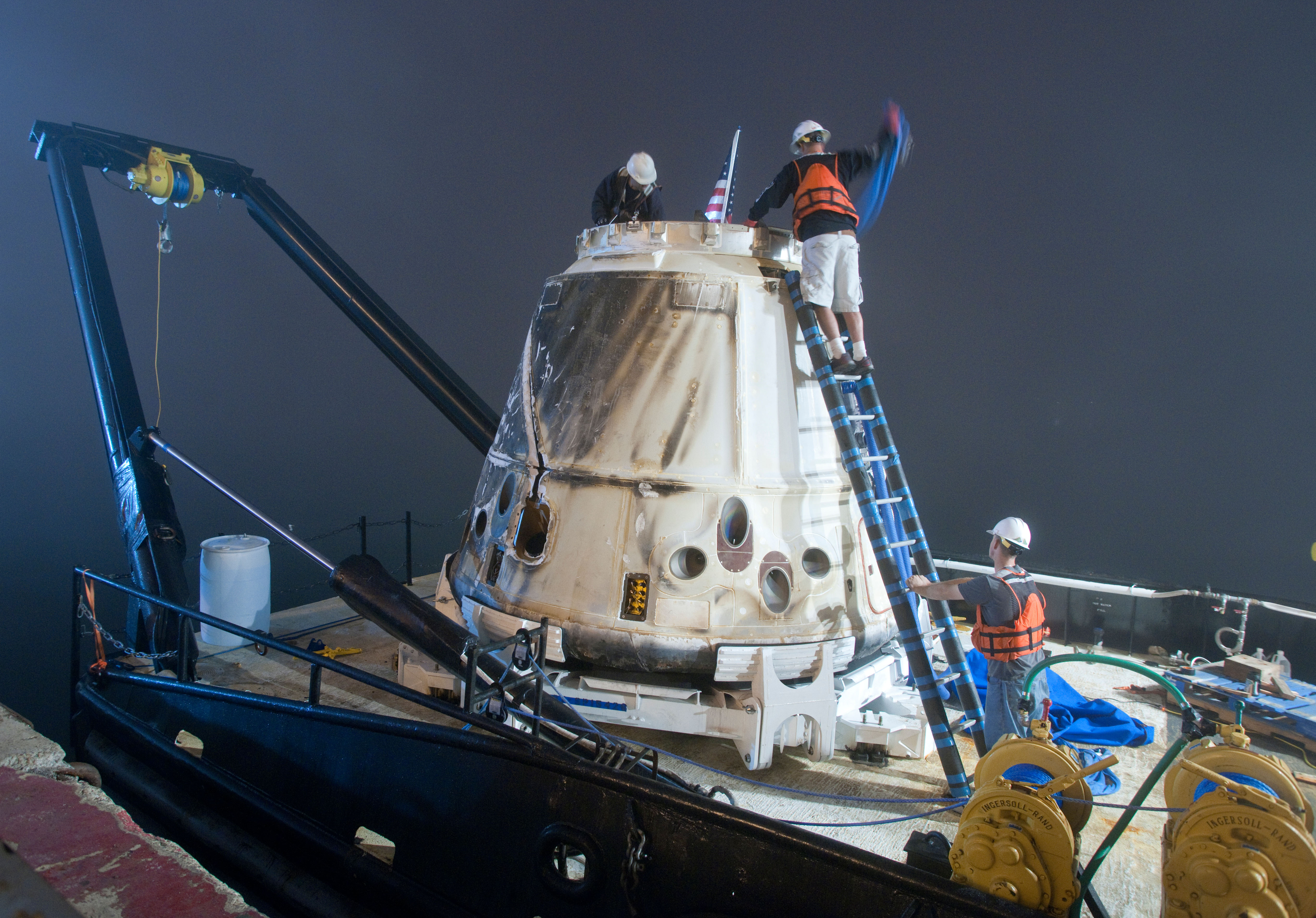
The SpX-1 capsule seen back at a port on 30 October 2012

Over a period of two and a half weeks, the ISS crew unloaded Dragon's payload and reloaded it with cargo for return to Earth.

After its mission at the orbital laboratory was completed, newly arrived Expedition 33 Flight Engineer Kevin Ford used the Canadarm2 robotic arm to detach Dragon from Harmony, maneuver it out to the 15 m (49 ft) release point, and release the vehicle. The Dragon then performed a series of three burns to place it on a trajectory away from the station. Approximately six hours after Dragon departed the station, it conducted a deorbit burn, which lasted up to 10 minutes. It takes about 30 minutes for Dragon to reenter in the Earth's atmosphere, allowing it to splashdown in the Pacific Ocean, about 450 km (280 mi) off the coast of southern California. The Dragon's trunk, which contains its solar arrays, have then been jettisoned.

The landing was controlled by automatic firing of its Draco thrusters during the atmospheric reentry. In a carefully timed sequence of events, dual drogue parachutes deploy at an altitude of 13,700 m (44,900 ft) to stabilize and slow the spacecraft. The full deployment of the drogues triggers the release of the three main parachutes, each 35 m (115 ft) in diameter, at about 3,000 m (9,800 ft). While the drogues detach from the spacecraft, the main parachutes further slow the spacecraft's descent to approximately 4.8 to 5.4 m/s (16 to 18 ft/s). Even if Dragon were to lose one of its main parachutes, the two remaining chutes would still permit a safe landing. The Dragon capsule is expected to land in the Pacific Ocean, about 450 km (280 mi) off the coast of southern California. SpaceX uses a 30 m (98 ft) boat equipped with an A-frame and an articulating crane, a 27.3 m (90 ft) crew boat for telemetry operations, and two 7.3 m (24 ft) rigid-hull inflatable boats to perform recovery operations. Onboard are approximately a dozen SpaceX engineers and technicians as well as a four-person dive team. Once the Dragon capsule splashed down, the recovery team secured the vehicle and then placed it on deck for the journey back to shore.

SpaceX technicians opened the side hatch of the vehicle and retrieved the time-critical items. The critical cargo items were placed on a fast-boat for the 450 km (280 mi) trip back to California for eventual return to NASA that then took care of the precious science cargo and handle the post-flight analysis of the samples. The rest of the cargo was unloaded once the Dragon capsule reached SpaceX's test facility in McGregor, Texas.

== Payload ==
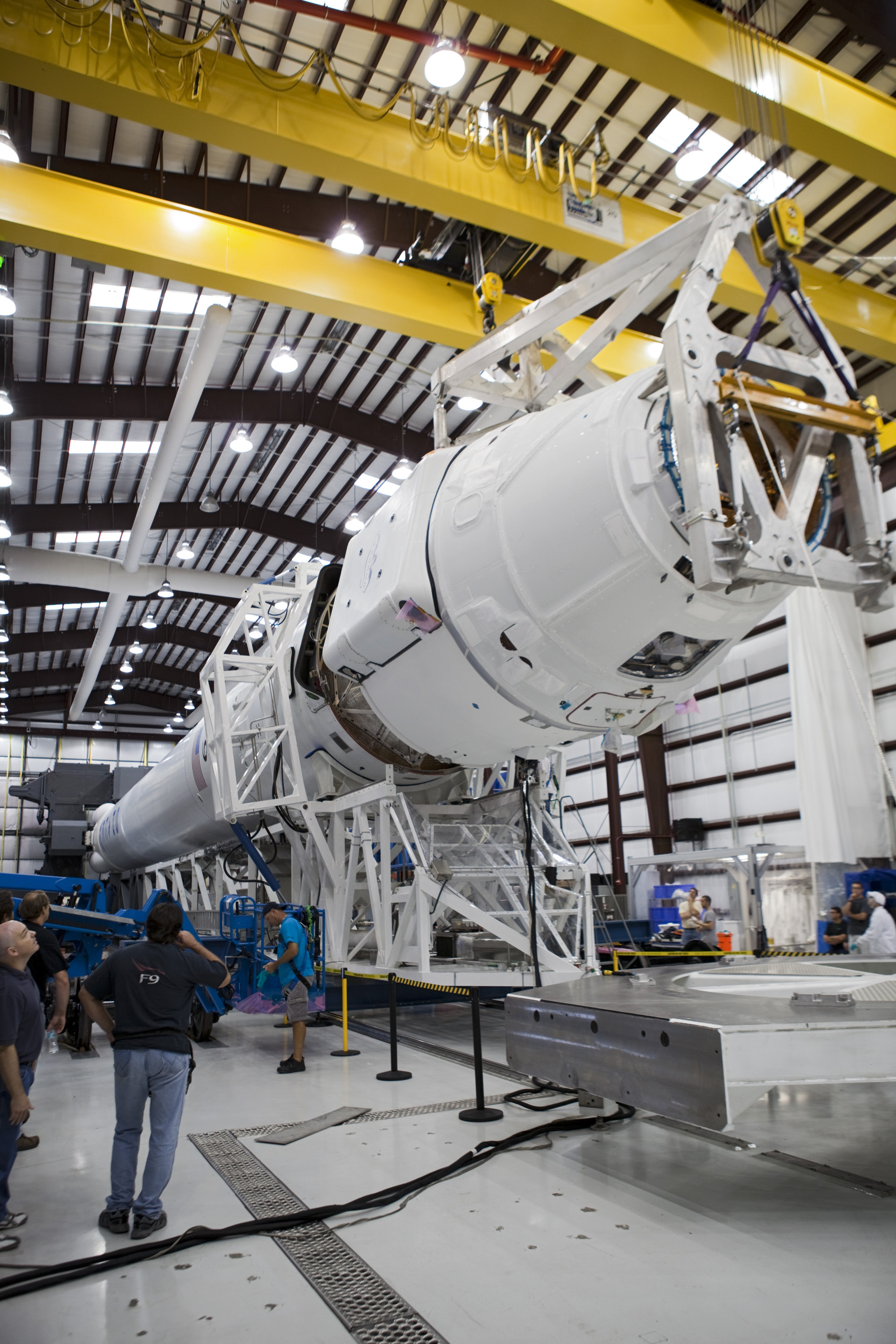
The Dragon spacecraft being integrated onto Falcon 9 on 30 September 2012

=== Primary payload ===
When launched the CRS-1 Dragon was filled with about 905 kg (1,995 lb) of cargo, 400 kg (880 lb) without packaging. Included was 118 kg (260 lb) of crew supplies, 117 kg (258 lb) of critical materials to support the 166 experiments on board the station and 66 new experiments, as well as 105.2 kg (232 lb) of hardware for the station as well as other miscellaneous items.

The Dragon returned 905 kg (1,995 lb) of cargo, 759 kg (1,673 lb) without packaging. Included was 74 kg (163 lb) of crew supplies, 393 kg (866 lb) of scientific experiments and experiment hardware, 235 kg (518 lb) of space station hardware, 33 kg (73 lb) of spacesuit equipment and 25 kg (55 lb) of miscellaneous items.

=== Secondary payload ===
For some months prior to the launch, a 150 kg (330 lb) prototype second-generation Orbcomm-G2 satellite was planned to be launched as a secondary payload from Falcon 9's second stage. Although the secondary payload made it to the Dragon insertion orbit, an engine anomaly on one of the nine engines on the Falcon 9 first stage during the ascent resulted in automatic engine shutdown and a longer first-stage burn on the remaining eight engines to complete orbital insertion while subsequently increasing use of propellant over the nominal mission.

The primary payload contractor, NASA, requires a greater-than-99% estimated probability that the stage of any secondary payload on a similar orbital inclination to the International Space Station will reach their orbital altitude goal above the station. Due to the engine failure, the Falcon 9 used more propellant than intended, reducing the success probability estimate to approximately 95%. Because of this, the second stage did not attempt a second burn, and Orbcomm-G2 was left in an unusable orbit and burned up in Earth's atmosphere within 4 days after the launch.

Both SpaceX and Orbcomm were aware, prior to the mission, of the high risk that the secondary payload satellite could remain at the lower altitude of the Dragon insertion orbit, and that was a risk that Orbcomm agreed to take given the dramatically lower cost of launch for a secondary payload.

== Launch attempts ==
Attempt	Planned	Result	Turnaround	Reason	Decision point	Weather go (%)	Notes
1	8 Oct 2012, 12:34:07 am	Partial success: Success for primary payload. Failure for secondary payload.	—			27 °C (81 °F)	At 79 seconds into the launch, Engine no. 1 lost pressure and was commanded by the rocket to shut down. Due to the engine failure on the first stage, safety protocols for rendezvous with the ISS prevented the secondary-payload Orbcomm-G2 satellite from being placed in the correct orbit.

== Falcon 9 engine anomaly ==
Video of the launch of SpaceX CRS-1 Falcon 9

During the ascent, 79 seconds after launch, an engine anomaly occurred with one of the nine engines on the Falcon 9 first stage. SpaceX has emphasized for several years that the Falcon 9 first stage is designed for "engine out" capability, with the capability to shut down one or more malfunctioning engines and still make a successful ascent. In the event, the SpaceX CRS-1's first stage shut down Engine no. 1, and as a result continued the first-stage burn on the remaining eight engines longer than usual at a somewhat reduced thrust to insert the Dragon spacecraft into the proper orbit. Although unintended, this was the first inflight demonstration of Falcon 9's "engine out" design, and "provides a clear demonstration of the engine out capability".

In response to the anomaly, NASA and SpaceX jointly formed the CRS-1 Post-Flight Investigation Board. Preliminary information from the post-flight review board indicates that the Engine no. 1 fuel dome, above the nozzle, ruptured but did not explode. The burning fuel that exited before the engine was shut down caused the fairing rupture, as seen in the flight video recordings. Subsequent investigations revealed in a Congressional hearing pinpointed the issue as a result of an undetected material flaw in the engine chamber jacket, likely introduced during engine production. During flight, the data suggests this material flaw ultimately developed into a breach in the main combustion chamber. This breach released a jet of hot gas and fuel in the direction of the main fuel line causing a secondary leak and ultimately a rapid drop in engine pressure. As a result, the flight computer commanded shutdown of Engine no. 1 and Falcon 9 continued on its path to ensure Dragon's entry into orbit for subsequent rendezvous and berthing with the ISS.

== See also ==
- List of Falcon 9 launches
