= Rick Tumlinson =

Rick Tumlinson is the co-founder of several space companies and non-profits including Deep Space Industries, Orbital Outfitters, the New Worlds Institute, and the Space Frontier Foundation. In 2004, Space News magazine listed Tumlinson as one of the 100 most influential people in the space industry, stating.

== Biography ==
Tumlinson produced a series of animated videos used to gain funding for the Air Force's DC-X rocket project, the International Space University, the X-33 rocket program, the Air Force's Space Command and created the first ever paid political announcement for space, which was featured on NPR's All Things Considered.

Tumlinson worked for scientist Gerard K. O'Neill at the Space Studies Institute and was involved in starting the Lunar Prospector project which discovered hints of water on the Moon.

Over the years he has been a witness in six congressional hearings on the future of NASA, the US space program and space tourism. In early 2004, Tumlinson testified before Senator John McCain and the Senate Space and Technology Committee on the Moon, Mars and Beyond program.

=== Contributions and projects ===
Tumlinson founded the Permission to Dream project, which has over the years placed dozens of telescopes in the hands of schools and groups around the world in hopes to educate and inspire interest in space.

He co-founded the now dissolved firm LunaCorp, which teamed up with Radio Shack on a proposed mission to send a robot rover to the moon to confirm that ice exists at its poles. He led the team which turned the Mir Space Station into the world's first commercial space facility, and was a co-founder of the space firm MirCorp as profiled in the documentary film Orphans of Apollo. Along the way he personally signed up Dennis Tito, the world's first "citizen explorer," and has assisted in numerous other such projects.

Rick was the Executive Director and co-Founder of the Foundation for the International Non-Governmental Development of Space (FINDS), a foundation with the objective to fund breakthrough projects and activities such as Helium 3 research, laser launch studies, and asteroid processing projects. The organization provided the first $100k in seed money for the founding of the Mars Society, operated the Cheap Access to Space Prize and supported such projects as The WATCH asteroid search program. FINDS also underwrote and co-sponsored a very successful series of Senate Roundtables on space issues in conjunction with the Foundation and the lobby ProSpace over the last few years.

A regular contributor to the space industry paper Space News, Tumlinson's writings and quotes have appeared in the New York Times, Wall Street Journal, Los Angeles Times, Miami Herald, Reader's Digest and other publications around the world. He has appeared on such television programs as ABC's World News Tonight, the CBS Morning Show, and Politically Incorrect.

In 2004, Tumlinson was one of 20 guests invited by the White House to hear President George W. Bush announce his plans to return to the Moon and explore Mars. He has been a consultant to the Robert A. Heinlein and Virginia Heinlein Prize Trust. He is editor of a book entitled Return to the Moon, a collection of papers by leading professionals in the space industry regarding the future of space exploration and the privatization of the return to the moon. In 2006, Tumlinson started his own space firm, XTreme Space and Orbital Outfitters.

Tumlinson is a member of the Leadership Board of For All Moonkind, Inc. a nonprofit organization committed to creating an effective and enforceable system to manage and protect human heritage in outer space.

== See also ==
- Orphans of Apollo
