= Orphans of Apollo =

- Directed by: Becky Neiman & Michael Potter
- Produced by: Michael Potter
- Starring: Rick Tumlinson
- Edited by: Todd Jones
- Release date: October 11, 2008 (Bend Film Festival)
- Country: United States
- Language: English

Orphans of Apollo is a 2008 documentary film analyzing the embryonic private spaceflight movement of the turn of the millennium, through MirCorp's attempt to privatize and save the Mir space station.

== Synopsis ==
Orphans of Apollo is a documentary film, covering the period in human spaceflight from the conclusion of NASA's Apollo Moon program to shortly after the Soviet Union's dissolution. A group of entrepreneurs, including Walt Anderson, Richard Branson, Tom Clancy, Jeffrey Manber, and Rick Tumlinson, grew up during the early Space Age. The sudden halt to rapid progress when that era closes then disappointed them — as the film's title indicates, they were "orphan[ed by] Apollo['s]" cancellation. When the Russian government decides that it no longer needs the soon-to-deorbit Mir space station, they hope to purchase the station with Walter Anderson's money and boost it to safety as a private space station.

However, the plan requires extensive cooperation. The Russian government must agree to sell the station to once-enemy foreigners. American government agencies must agree to license and perform a space mission that boosts the station to safety — thereby creating a non-governmental competitor to their services. With limited money, the entrepreneurs cannot coordinate all the players before time runs out and the space station deorbits.

== Production ==
The film combines archival Russian film footage, archival NASA film footage, IMAX footage, and original interviews with major players in the project. It was produced by Michael Potter, co-directed by Potter and Becky Neiman, and edited by Todd Jones.

== Reception ==
In honor of the 50th anniversary of the Smithsonian Institution's space collections, an exclusive screening of Orphans of Apollo was shown in the National Air and Space Museum’s Lockheed Martin IMAX Theater.

The film also won the Space Frontier Foundation’s Vision of the Future award in 2008.

== See also ==
- Black Sky: The Race For Space, 2005 documentary about the Ansari X Prize
