= Volute (disambiguation) =

A volute is a spiral, scroll-like ornament that forms the basis of the Ionic order, found in the capital of the Ionic column.

Volute may also refer to:

== Science and technology ==
- Volutidae (common name volutes), a taxonomic family of predatory sea snails
- Volute (pump), the casing in a centrifugal pump
- Volute spring, a compression spring in the form of a cone

== Other uses ==
- Volute, a spiral or scroll form in the arabesque form of artistic decoration
- Volute, a handrail for a bullnose step that is shaped like a spiral; See Stairs
- Volute krater, a type of Greek urn
- Volute, a scroll-shaped carving at the tuning head of stringed musical instruments
