= Turbopump =

Pump driven by a gas turbine

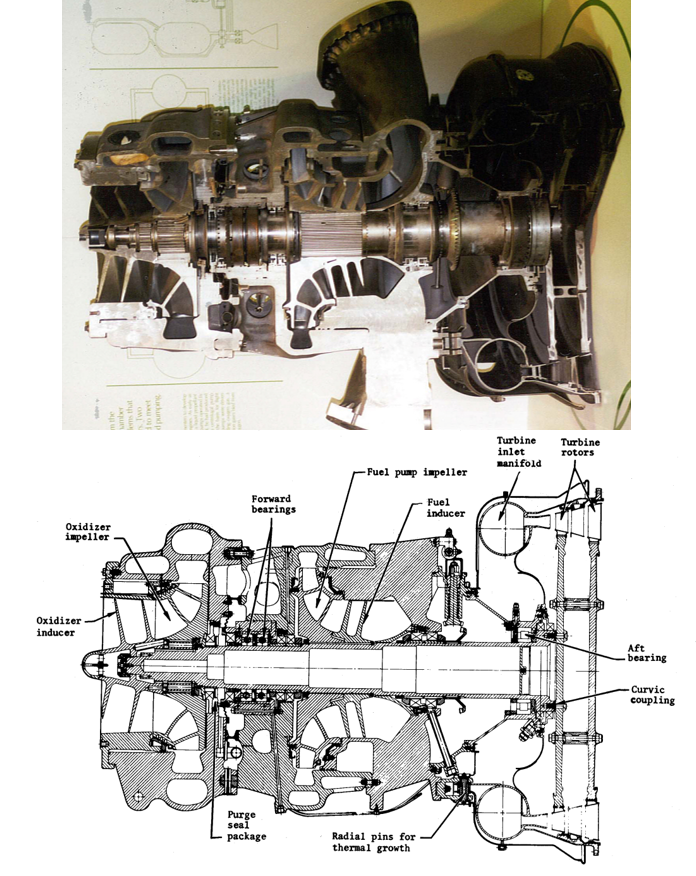
Cutaway of the turbopump used in the F1 rocket engine (Saturn V first stage). This is a centrifugal/radial design, which is nearly ubiquitous in turbopumps.

A turbopump (portmanteau of turbine pump) is an assembly consisting of a liquid pump driven by a gas turbine, connected via a shaft (and occasionally gears as well). They were initially developed in the US and Germany in the 1930s and 1940s. While other use cases can exist, the primary purpose of turbopumps is to dramatically raise the pressure of liquid propellants and feed them to the combustion chamber of a rocket engine. While they have considerably higher design complexity, turbopump fed systems scale much more favorably in large rockets than pressure-fed systems, which require increasingly thick and heavy tanks to supply high chamber pressures in the engines.

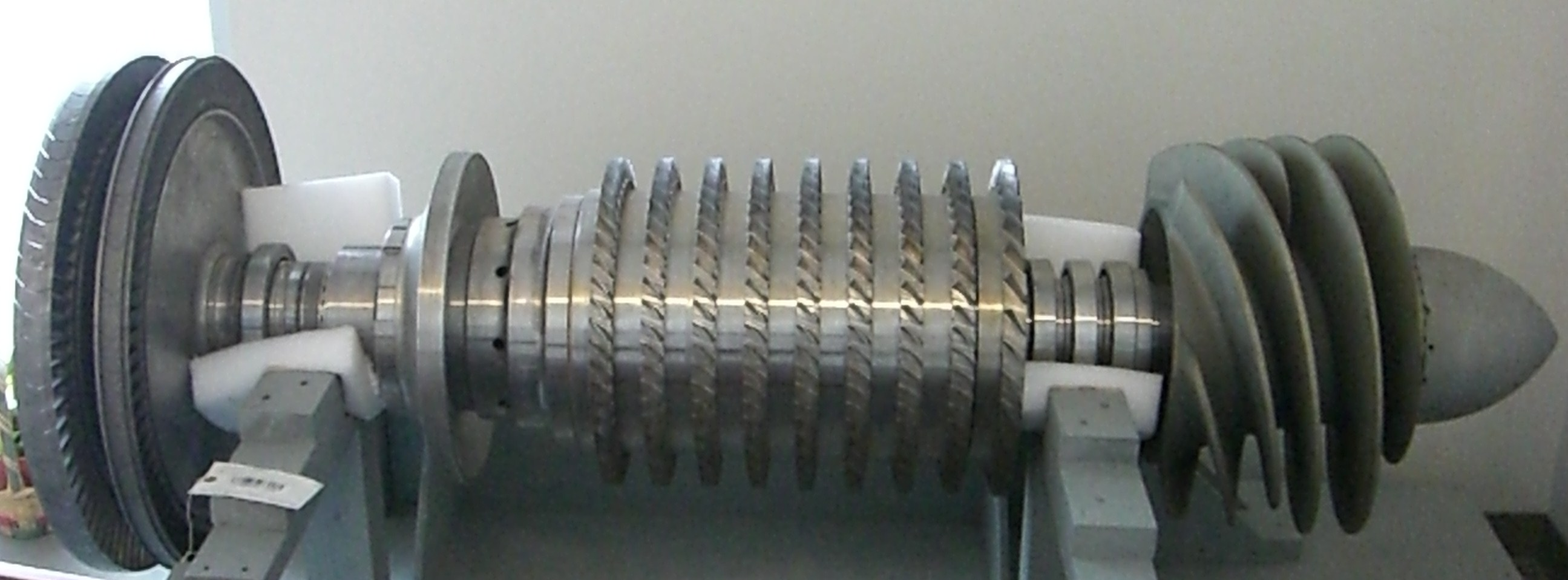
Part of an axial turbopump designed and built for the M-1 rocket engine. Axial designs are rare in turbopumps aside from a few liquid hydrogen pumps.

Two types of pumps have been used in turbopumps: most common are centrifugal pumps, where the pumping is done by throwing fluid outward at high speed, while much rarer are axial-flow pumps, where alternating rotating and static blades progressively raise the pressure of a fluid. Centrifugal designs give high head (pressure increase) but modest flow rates, while axial designs give high flow rates (advantageous for low density fluids, i.e. liquid hydrogen) but modest head, and so usually need many stages in series.

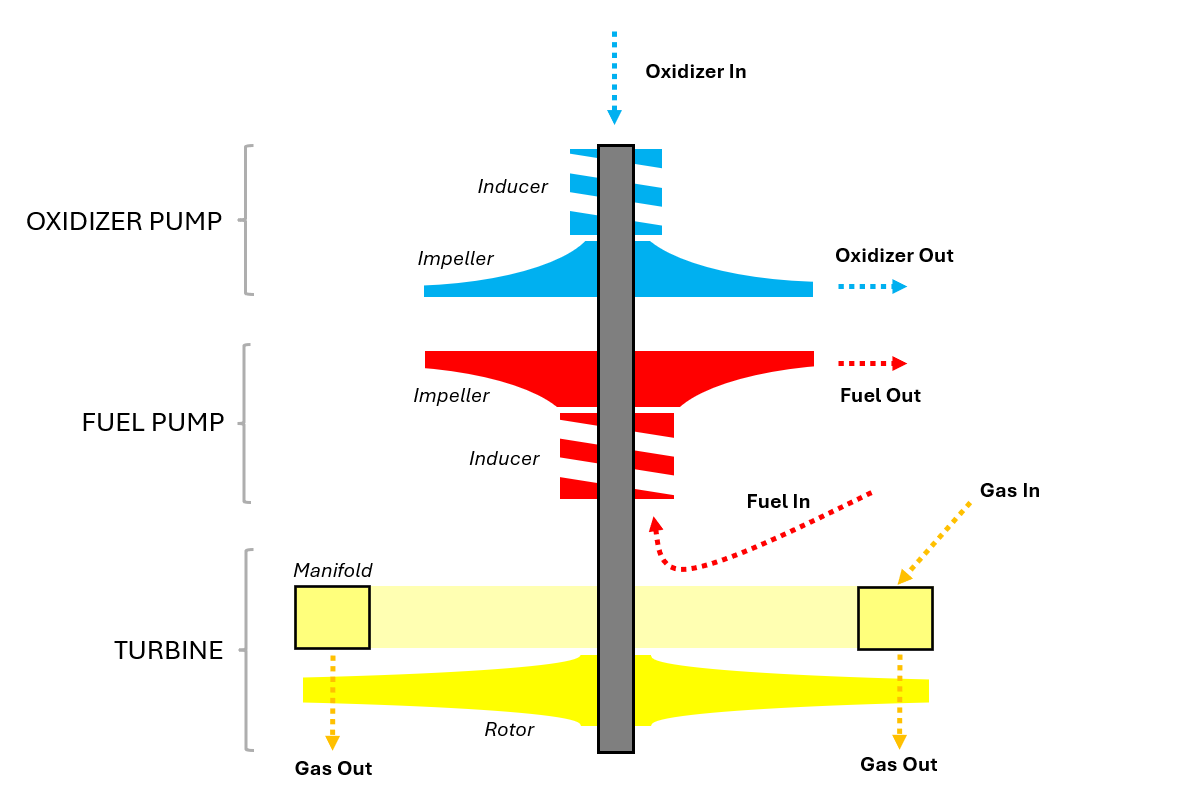
A common turbopump arrangement. Note that there are many possible, and common, variations to this arrangement including mounting the turbine between the pumps, having a multistage turbine, separating the fuel pump and ox pumps onto dual shafts, etc.

== Design principles ==
=== Hydrodynamic design ===
The pump side of turbopumps consist of impellers that spin at very high speeds (thousands of RPM) in order to pump liquid propellants. Impellers are mounted on a central shaft, which also has a turbine mounted to it (or in some cases geared off on a different shaft). The turbine supplies shaft power, which is then consumed by the impellers in order to impart energy to the liquid propellants. Impellers mostly impart this energy by accelerating the liquid to a high velocity. However the ultimate goal is not a fast liquid, but a high pressure one; so surrounding the impeller is either a volute or a diffuser - these are specially shaped housings to decelerate the flow which then consequently dramatically increases its pressure (via Bernoulli's principle). The liquid is then discharged to the rest of the rocket engine, or in some cases to a second impeller and volute/diffuser stage which increases the pressure even further.

Turbopumps on liquid rocket engines virtually always have inducers as well, upstream of the impellers. Inducers are spiral shaped pumping elements that serve to gently raise the pressure of the incoming fluid enough to prevent it cavitating when it reaches the impeller. In many cases the impeller and inducer are manufactured as a single component, with a gradual transition between the axial spiral and the radial blades.

=== Aerodynamic design ===
The turbine side of turbopumps consist of one or more stages, where each stage has a stator and a rotor. Individual rotor discs in a turbine are more commonly referred to as wheels in the modern day. These turbines are virtually always of the axial type, because of the very high gas flow (volumetrically) needed to supply enough shaft power for a liquid rocket engine. Contrast this with turbochargers, which usually feature radial turbine designs because of their much lower gas flow.

Upstream of the turbine is the turbine manifold, which collects gas from whatever source that rocket engine's cycle has upstream of it, and then disperses it circumferentially along the rim of the turbine. It then flows from the manifold axially downwards to the stages of the turbine. Stators are typically bladed, though it is also quite common (where pressure drop is particularly high, as in gas generator cycles) to forgo blades and drill angled nozzles directly off of the manifold itself to then impinge on the turbine wheel.

Downstream of the turbine varies based on cycle - in closed cycles it leads to the main injector of the engine, where (depending on whether the turbine is fuel-rich or ox-rich), one of the propellants can be injected into the main combustion chamber as a gas which can be very advantageous for promoting propellant atomization and mixing. In open cycles it is dumped to atmosphere. This can either mean dumped overboard directly off the side of the engine, or it can also lead to a manifold on the rocket engine nozzle which then injects it in the main flowpath, far downstream of the throat where ambient pressure is much lower than the chamber. The purpose here is to provide extra film cooling to the nozzle, since the hot gas leaving the turbine is nevertheless much cooler than the gas in the main combustion chamber. The latter option is common in vacuum optimized open cycle engines because they have much larger nozzles (with correspondingly large areas that need cooling, often without a regen jacket at its furthest extremes). The dumped gas from the turbine can still provide a non-negligible portion of the engine thrust. For this reason even if it is dumped overboard directly, there will usually still be a housing and a mild converging-diverging nozzle downstream of the turbine to take full advantage of the extra thrust opportunity. There is also an opportunity to extract waste heat from the flow at this point via heat exchangers; useful for heating up repressurizing gas for the tanks, for example.

=== Cycle design ===
Turbomachinery / engine cycle design looks very different in liquid rocket engines compared to air-breathing engines (turbojets) for essentially one main reason: turbine materials cannot survive combustion chamber temperatures. Rocket engine cycles are all various workarounds to this fundamental problem. In contrast, air-breathing engines avoid this by intentionally limiting combustion temperatures dramatically lower, which it can do economically because its oxidizer / reaction mass source is much more plentiful (i.e., the air).

The first ever turbopump designs (by Goddard, early 1930s) did partially put the turbine into the main combustion chamber flow with regenerative cooling. By the time of actual builds in the later 1930s, he had moved on to a rudimentary expander cycle, and then ultimately a gas generator cycle.

The turbine of a turbopump is always driven by high pressure gas. The exact source of this gas is the primary differentiator between the various rocket engine cycles. Air-breathing engines (turbojets and similar) mount their turbine downstream of the burner and take direct advantage of the full flow and pressure of the engine. Rocket engines have never been able to do this because their mixture ratios are much closer to stoichiometric (since oxidizer comes at a premium; it must be carried with the rocket) and thus the flame temperature in the combustion chamber is dramatically higher. They are so high that nearly all possible materials would melt, and even the few that do not have very little structural strength left at these temperatures.

For this reason, rocket engine cycles are all various schemes to circumvent this and supply hot gas to the turbine that is nevertheless much cooler than the main combustion chamber gas. Gas generator and staged combustion cycles do this by mounting an entirely separate and smaller combustion chamber to the engine, termed the gas generator (whose gas is ultimately dumped overboard) or the preburner (whose "pre-burnt" gas eventually reaches the main combustion chamber after passing through the turbine). These smaller chambers run very far from stoichiometric, either with way too much fuel or way too much oxidizer. Hence, one can have "fuel rich" and "ox rich" gas generator and staged combustion cycles. One could also have two preburners, one fuel rich and one ox rich, which is termed "full flow staged combustion".

Beyond these, there are also expander cycles, where liquid propellant is heated (usually fuel) in the regenerative cooling loop of the main combustion chamber, to the point of boiling, and then fed as gas to the turbine. The last major cycle is the tap off cycle, where a portion of the main combustion gas is "tapped off" and routed to the turbine. Because of the aforementioned temperature problem, tap off cycles require large dedicated heat exchangers to rapidly cool the re-routed gas before it reaches the turbine.

=== Mechanical design ===
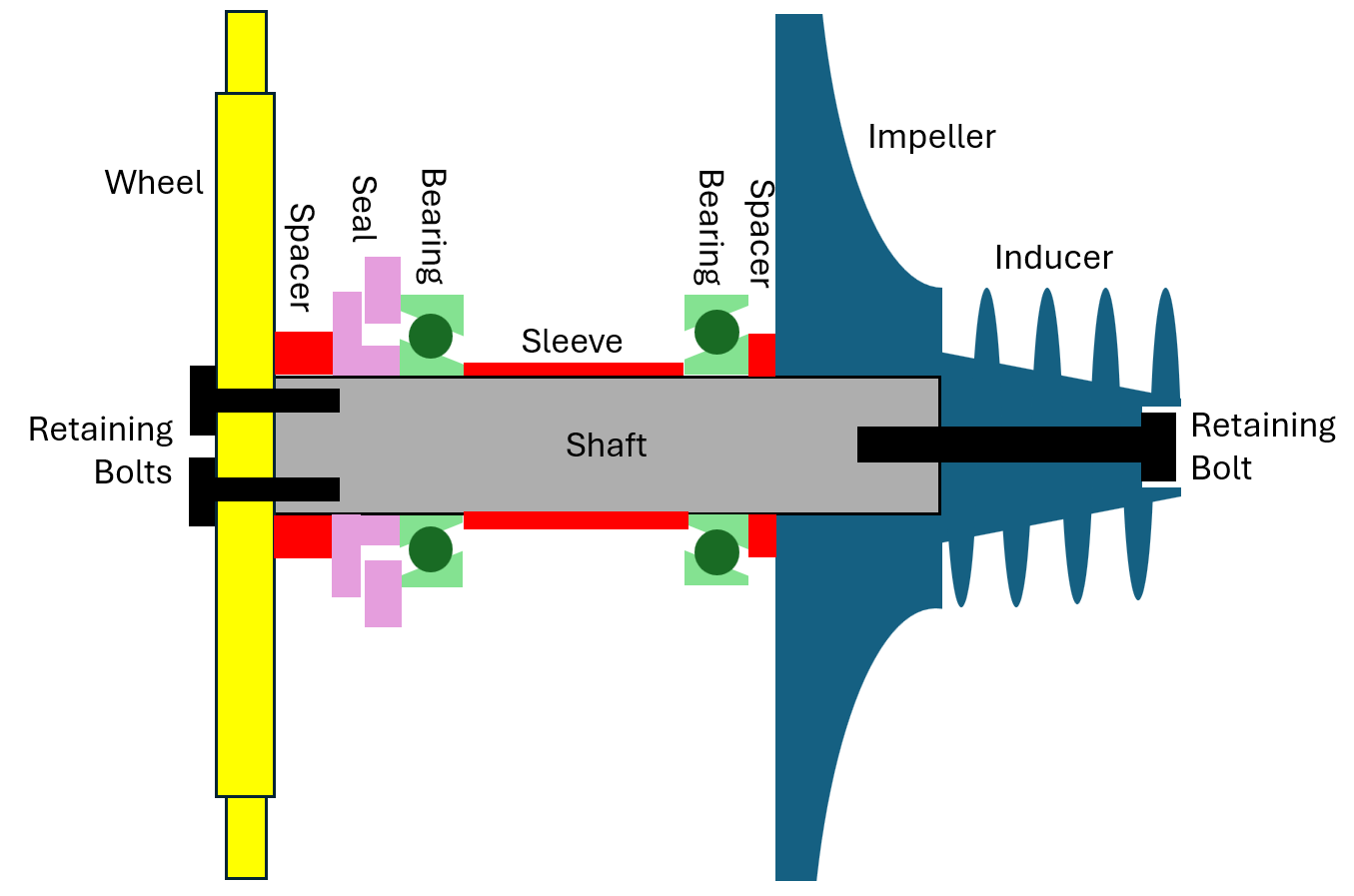
Simplified mechanical design of a turbopump rotor. The retaining bolts, when torqued, will put net tension in the shaft and net compression in the stackup of components that encase it. This preload increases the stiffness of the full rotor assembly.

The collection of all rotating components in a turbopump (i.e. the impellers, inducers, wheels, shaft, parts of the seals, and various spacers) are collectively known as the "rotor". The rotor is spinning at extreme angular velocities: shaft speeds in the tens of thousands of RPM are common. Nominally the only mechanical connection between the rotor and the rest of the turbopump is via the bearings. Most common by far are ball bearings, with some modern exceptions pivoting to hydrodynamic bearings. The goal of bearing selection is to minimize friction - both because high friction can wear out the bearing, and also because any frictional energy losses are dissipated as heat that must be carried away rapidly to not destroy the bearing. The extra challenge in turbopump design is that the local environment in the pumps is very often at cryogenic temperatures, which virtually all greases and oils normally used to lubricate bearings are not compatible with (they freeze). Therefore, turbopump bearings do not use lubricants at all in the traditional sense. Rather, they are installed as bare metal, and some amount of cold propellant is intentionally routed through them (i.e. where the balls are) to dissipate the heat generated by their friction. This bearing cooling circuit is a secondary flow that the hydrodynamic designer must also design in addition to the primary flow of the propellant through the inducer/impeller/volute.

Turbopumps can be very sensitive to the exact placement of components and the loads/stresses developed in them. Hydrodynamic considerations typically demand very tight clearances between the impellers / inducers and the pump housings, as well as aerodynamic considerations demanding tight clearances between turbine wheels and stators / manifolds. Furthermore, rotordynamics demands a high stiffness coupling of the rotating components with the shaft, especially when it comes to the turbine wheel.

These considerations and more demand high precision and high stiffness mechanical design. Bolted joints are generally the default method by which to join parts; some turbopumps have welded joints as well but require more careful consideration and analysis because of their generally lower stiffness, potential for thermally induced warpage of the parts during the welding process, as well as increased risk of fatigue over the life of the turbopump. In order for the rotor to act structurally as one rigid object, all of the components are stacked into one long stackup along the shaft that is then preloaded onto it from both ends. This moderately loads the ball bearings, which are usually of the angular contact type, which increases their stiffness. Typically the preload is supplied one end by a bolt clamping onto the nose of the inducer and threaded into the end of the shaft below it. Depending on the exact configuration of the turbopump, the other end could be another inducer (for the other propellant), or a turbine wheel which will also have preloaded bolt(s) onto the end of the shaft.

Design of the shaft itself is driven by the need to carry high torque; the more torque it can carry the more power can be transferred from the turbine to the pump(s). Shaft power is the product of shaft speed and shaft torque. This high torque requirement drives the designer to maximizing the polar moment of inertia of the shaft. It is not uncommon for shafts to be hollow, as this maximizes this polar moment of inertia for a given weight of material. Shafts also need to transfer torque to the components of the rotor stackup. This can be accomplished via keyways, which carry less torque but are easier to manufacture, splines which generally carry higher torque but are more difficult to manufacture, or shear pins, which are common for components attached to the circular face of the shaft (i.e. turbine wheels).

=== Rotorthrust Design ===
It is imperative not to axially overload the bearings; doing so can lead to catastrophic failure of the turbopump and thus the engine. The rotor acts a rigid object that is almost entirely separated from the static pump casings; the only components preventing it translating up or down are the bearings on either end. There are significant axial forces (both hydrodynamic and aerodynamic) acting on each of the components on the rotor pushing it in an axial direction. The cumulative sum of these axial forces is known as the "rotorthrust" (not to be confused with the thrust of the entire engine). The major rotorthrust components are:

- Inducer: sees significant upwards axial force; in other words the inducer wants to "swim upstream" and pulls up on the bolt clamping it down to the top of the rotor. This arises because it has higher downstream pressure than upstream (which is the entire point of the inducer; a higher pressure differential means it is doing its hydrodynamic job well). This is also the main source of blade loading, which is a major design constraint for the component level design of the inducer.
- Impeller: sees a combination of forces. The first comes from conservation of momentum that pushes the impeller downwards, because the impeller is redirecting the axial downwards linear momentum of the incoming flow into radial outwards momentum, and the conservation law demands that the missing downwards component be transmitted into the impeller itself. The second force comes from a pressure mismatch between the shroud region of the impeller and the backdisk region. The directionality of this force is not predestined: it can be manipulated by the hydrodynamic designer. This is typically accomplished via the design of labyrinth seals separating the shroud and backdisk regions from the inlet and discharge regions, as well as intentionally machined "swirl breaks": curved features that can be added to the housing or the impeller itself to manipulate flow and pressure distribution across the impeller. These intentional designs manipulate the radial pressure distribution, described by the following equation:

$P_2-P_1 = \frac{\rho}{2}K^2\omega^2(r_2^2-r_1^2)$

where $K$ is a swirl factor (derived from CFD and/or test). Typically region 2 is the impeller discharge and region 1 is the radial station in question.

- Turbine: typically sees a downwards axial force, away from the turbine manifold. This arises because of the turbine wheel extracting energy from the working gas so it loses pressure as it flows through the blades; thus the downstream region is at a lower pressure than the upstream backdisk region. This effect is most pronounced in reaction-style turbines, and increases with the degree of reaction, because these turbine wheels are designed to extract energy from the pressure of the gas. Impulse-style turbines have a degree of reaction of zero and thus theoretically do not see any pressure drop or rotorthrust, because these turbine wheel are designed to extract energy from the velocity of the gas, not its pressure (the pressure drop occurs across the upstream stator). In the real world these turbines often have inefficiencies making them not perfect impulse types and so still see some small amount of dp; integrated across the large face of the turbine wheel this can accumulate into a significant net force.

Some turbopumps are designed so that rotorthrust can be tuned. This can be accomplished via return lines that connect impeller backdisk and/or shroud regions that recirculate some small amount for the flow to a lower pressure region (e.g. the pump inlet or a bleed to atmosphere) and thus reduce the pressure on those impeller regions. These return lines can have in-line orifices or valves that are manipulated by turbopump operators to tune the rotorthrust to a desired magnitude for bearing health. For example acceptance testing of an engine may involve reconfiguring these return lines between hotfires to tune the rotorthrust, before the engine is sent off for flight.

Both tuning and pump/bearing qualification rely on test engineers knowing (at least approximately) what rotorthrust is reached during an engine burn. There are multiple ways this can be accomplished - the most direct (but also technically complex) approach is with an integrated load cell in the pump that lies in the load path between the bearings and the housing. Another approach is to inspect the bearings after a hotfire test, looking for signs of wear on the races from the axial force of the balls and correlate this with some component level test experience to estimate the magnitude of rotorthrust that corresponds with the observed degree of wear. A third and common approach is to include pressure transducers at various key points in the turbopump (upstream/downstream of inducer, impeller, turbine would be the main ones), and then combine their readings in software with the known geometry of the various components on the rotor to integrate all these pressures into force components that are then added into an overall rotorthrust.

It is also important not to underload the bearings. The nature of the rotor acting collectively as one rigid body means that as more load is placed onto a bearing on one end of the turbopump, load will naturally decrease on the bearing on the other end. If this other bearing's load drops too low it will rapidly lose joint stiffness with the housing it is sitting in, massively reducing its effectiveness in constraining the rotor with respect to the housing - rotordynamic effects can take over and at worst case a crash between the rotor and the housing with catastrophic consequences. One way to design around this is to preload the bearings against the housing to such a degree that there is always margin to either bearing dropping too low on its axial preload. This method is simpler, though somewhat wasteful in the sense that highly preloading the bearings eats up margin in the other direction - i.e. they are now closer to either one becoming too highly loaded. A second method for design around the underloading problem is to incorporate a compliant component (e.g. a wave spring) between the bearing outer race and the housing. This way even if the rotor shifts and starts trying to underload one of the bearings, the wave spring on that end expands and applies a consistent preload to its bearing - it physically cannot drop to zero load.

Pairs of angular-contact bearings can either be arranged in an X or an O pattern. The predominance of rotorthrust over radial forces pushes turbopump design to heavily favor the O arrangement. In this arrangement the direction of thrust points from the loaded bearing to the center of mass of the rotor. This is an inherently more stable arrangement than the reverse; the rotor essentially hangs like a pendulum from whichever bearing it is currently resting on (gravitational forces are typically negligible compared to the pressure forces generating rotorthrust, so the rotor can even be "hanging" upside down). This improves rotordynamics and reduces the possible amount of misalignment between rotor and housing, which leads to better hydrodynamic performance of many components (especially the inducer tips, and also labyrinth seals) that depend on tight and consistent clearances.

=== Seal design ===
Turbopumps need to keep fuel and oxidizer apart from each other; otherwise there is high risk of ignition in the turbopump that will cascade into a total failure of the rocket engine. Secondarily they also need to keep propellants out of the turbine cavity; to avoid wastage and also to avoid changing the conditions of the gas flow through the turbine. They especially want to keep oxidizer out of a turbine running fuel-rich, and fuel out of a turbine running ox-rich. This is because leakage in this case would push the oxidizer/fuel mixture ratio (MR) of the working gas closer to stoichiometric, increasing its flame temperature which may be too much for the turbine materials to handle. For these reasons turbopumps always have dynamic seals around their shafts, where one part of the seal is attached to the rotor and corotating with it, while the other part is statically attached to the housing.

The dynamic seals in turbopumps have quite specialized requirements compared to seals in most systems. They must support very high shaft speeds on shafts of significant diameter, meaning rubbing velocities are very high. They usually need to be cryogenically compatible as well, and oxygen-compatible on the seals exposed to the oxidizer side. This eliminates the possibility of elastomer based seals, which will embrittle (and cannot hold up at these speeds anyways). Spring loaded and other compression type seals are also not practical at these speeds.

In practice, turbopumps primarily use three types of seals: labyrinth seals, face seals, and carbon ring seals.

- Labyrinth seals are a non-contact type where the fluid is routed through a circuitous path that minimizes the seal's discharge coefficient, and thus minimizes leakage through it. Labyrinth seals leak the most of the three types, and so are seldom used in isolation.
- Face seals consist of two metal sealing faces that are lapped to a very smooth finish and are pressed together during assembly. These face seals can be of a contacting variety (designed to rub during operation) or of a non-contact "lift-off" variety, with specially machined/etched surface feature that encourage the development of a thin microfilm of leakage fluid between them during operation that minimizes friction between the static and rotating face.
- Carbon ring seals are contact seals that consist of multiple carbon static segments around the shaft. They are pressed tightly around the shaft and during operation will intentionally "wear in" to provide a precision sealing surface with minimal leakage.

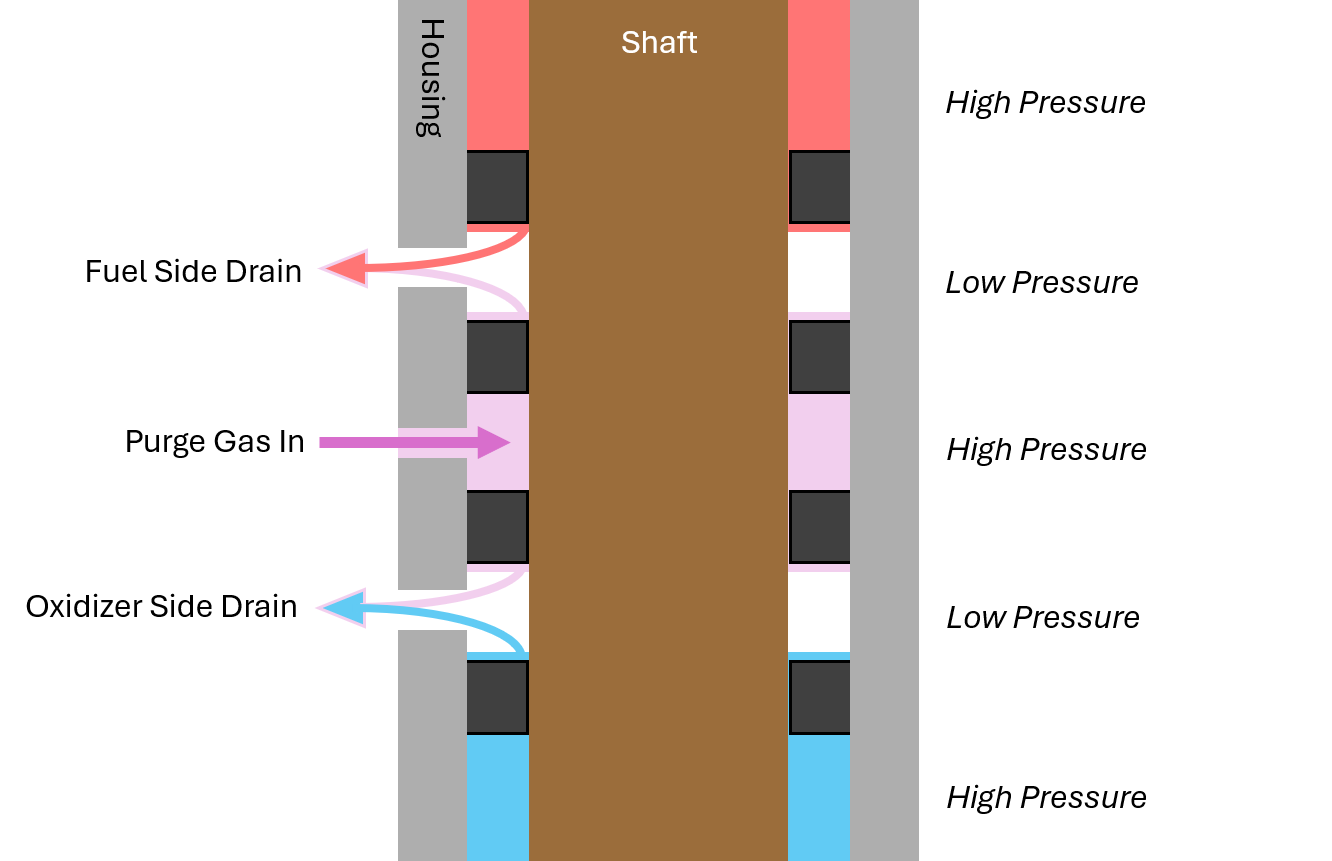
Example of an interpropellant seal layout. Purge gas is usually helium. The individual seals are often contacting, segmented carbon ring seals

==== Interpropellant Seal ====
In practice, all three of these seal types will leak to some extent. A large part of seal design is providing safe flow paths for this leakage. There is one interface in most rocket engines which is imperative does not leak at all: that is the interpropellant seal (IPS), which prevents fuel and oxidizer from leaking together. This is often accomplished by having a central cavity that is continuously purged with inert gas (e.g. helium) at a higher pressure than the propellants on either side, so that the IPS will leak that inert buffer gas outwards from the cavity instead of propellants inwards to the cavity. A failure of the IPS is one of the main methods that a rocket engine can fail catastrophically, as a fire can quickly start inside of the turbopump.

The IPS is an active barrier that must be continuously supplied with purge gas during engine operation including the chill period before the main burn. Rockets often carry helium bottles on the stage side to supply the IPS continuously before and during flight. The only engines that are able to forgo an IPS entirely are full flow staged combustion cycles, because they have one entirely fuel rich turbopump and one entirely ox rich turbopump whose flowpaths do not interact with each other.

=== Rotordynamic design ===
A major driver of turbopump mechanical design and shaft speed selection (which by extension affects hydrodynamic and aerodynamic design), is its rotordynamics. At high speed the rotor can start precessing in its bearings, which can induce large stresses and cause failure. This phenomenon is referred to as whirling. Of paramount importance is to avoid running the shaft near to critical speeds, defined as speeds that will excite natural frequencies in the design.

Beyond tuning the speed, one can mitigate whirling by avoiding cantilevering large masses (e.g. impellers or turbine wheels) being cantilevered away from bearings. From a rotordynamic perspective, the ideal turbopump has bearings at the extreme ends of the shaft and all the rotor components between them (the RD-180 turbopump gets somewhat close to doing this). In most engines this kind of design is usually impractical; for example it creates rather complex flow paths. Instead the engineer's task is to minimize the cantilevered length, and increase the stiffness of the load path between the cantilevered components and the bearings - hence the desire to preload rotor components onto the shaft.

When first assembled, rotors will usually have some amount of imbalance, where the center of mass does not precisely coincide with the center of rotation on the shaft. Because of this, rotors must be balanced before they are installed into the turbopump. The typical method is subtractive, where the rotor is spun in a balancing machine and then small amounts of material are progressively removed (e.g. via grinding or similar) from the turbine wheel. This is done in a strategic way to reduce the moment of inertia of the rotor below some set value.

== Impellers ==
A few criteria are used when sizing and designing impellers. The first is specific speed. This is a pseudo-dimensionless parameter characterizing the impeller discharge, for which certain ranges of values are empirically known to indicate different impeller designs would be optimal.

$N_s = \frac{N_{RPM} \cdot \sqrt{Q_{gpm}}}{H_{ft}^{0.75}} \,\,\,\,\,\,\,\, n_q = \frac{N_{RPM} \cdot \sqrt{Q_{m^3/s}}}{H_m^{0.75}} \,\,\,\,\,\,\,\, \omega_s = \frac{\omega_{rad/s} \cdot \sqrt{Q_{m^3/s}}}{(g \cdot H_m)^{0.75}}$

$\omega_s = \frac{N_s}{2733.00} = \frac{n_q}{52.9186}$

- $H$ = head
- $Q$ = volumetric flowrate
- $N$ = shaft speed

$N_s$ is the imperial version, common in US literature. $n_q$ is common in European literature. $\omega_s$ is the dimensionless version, but is not yet commonly seen in pump literature. The second parameter is similar: the suction specific speed. This characterizes the impeller's inlet (suction) conditions, and is used to quantify the required inducer and tank pressures upstream of the impeller.

$N_{ss} = \frac{N \cdot Q^{0.5}}{(NPSH_r)^{0.75}}$

$NPSH_r$ = net positive suction head, required (to not excessively cavitate)

Excessive cavitation is often defined as the level that would degrade the pump's discharge head by 3% – hence it is common to see $NPSH_r$ defined as $NPSH_{3%}$. Generally the suction specific speed is a primary design choice based on previous experience; an $N_{ss}$ of 11,000 ($\omega_{ss}$ of 4.02) is commonly considered an upper limit for good performance.

Another key parameter is the impeller's head coefficient $\psi$. This characterizes how effective a given tip speed $u_{out}$ is at generating head. Head coefficient is typically selected (for a given specific speed) from empirical curves generated by previous industry experience.

$\psi=\frac{2gH}{u_{out}^2}$ in some sources; $\psi=\frac{gH}{u_{out}^2}$ in others.

This article uses the latter form of head coefficient. Once a desired shaft speed and head coefficient is selected by the designer, an impeller radius is straightforward to derive:

$u_{out}^2=\frac{gH}{\psi}=\omega^2 r_{out}^2 \rightarrow r_{out}=\frac{\sqrt{gH/\psi}}{\omega}$

=== Centrifugal (radial) impellers ===
The optimum blade angle of an impeller is dependent on tip speed u, absolute flow velocity (both its tangential and meridional components), and on flow slippage. From these a blade angle can be found geometrically.

Centrifugal impellers are optimal on a range of 500 < $N_s$ < 2500 (numbers are approximate and vary by source).

Most turbopumps have centrifugal impellers - the fluid enters the pump along its rotational axis and the impeller accelerates the fluid to high speed. The fluid then passes through a volute (which spirals outwards to the outlet) or a diffuser, which is a ring with multiple diverging channels. This causes a large increase in dynamic pressure as fluid velocity is lost. The volute or diffuser turns the high kinetic energy into high pressures (hundreds of bar is not uncommon), and if the outlet backpressure is not too high, high flow rates can be achieved.

The development of the contours of the impeller blades, especially their inlet and outlet angles, is a major driver of the turbopump's overall hydrodynamic performance. Impeller blade geometry development begins with Euler's pump equation, which determines the absolute tangential flow velocity necessary to generate the required head:

$\Delta P = gH = \eta (u_{out} v_{tang,out} - u_{in} v_{tang,in}) = \eta \omega (r_{out} v_{tang,out} - r_{in} v_{tang,in})$

$v_{tang,out} = \frac{{gH/\eta \omega} + r_{in} v_{tang,in}}{r_{out}}$

- $\eta$ = pump efficiency (unitless). This summarizes all inefficiencies into one term.
- $u$ = blade tangential velocity (m/s)
- $v$ = absolute flow velocity (m/s). In a stationary frame of reference.
- $\omega$ = angular velocity (rad/s)
- $r$ = radial position (m)

The optimal outlet blade angle is found from the absolute flow velocity and slippage:

$\tan{\beta}=\frac{v_{merid,out}}{u_{out}-v_{tang,out}-v_{slip}}$

- $v_{slip}$ = $(1-\mu) \cdot u_{out}$ = slip velocity (m/s)
- $\mu$ = slip factor. Found from empirical approximations and CFD.

==== Mixed-flow impellers ====
Between the specific-speed ranges of radial and axial impellers, nominally lie mixed-flow impellers. These are rare to nonexistent in turbopumps. They have increased manufacturing complexity, and it is easier to adjust one's specific speed out of this range towards radial or axial designs.

=== Axial impellers ===
Axial impellers are optimal on a range of 8000 < $N_s$ < 20,000 (numbers are approximate and vary by source).

In this case the shaft essentially has (sometimes multiple) rotor wheels and stators along the shaft, and then pumps the fluid in a direction parallel with the main axis of the pump. Compared to centrifugal impellers, axial impellers trade lower head generation for higher volumetric flowrates of propellants. For this reason they can be attractive for pumping liquid hydrogen, because of its significantly lower density than essentially all other propellants which use centrifugal pump designs.

The only pure axial pump to have ever flown operationally was on the J-2 engine of the Saturn V upper stages. This is of course not counting inducers, which are ubiquitous, and in some uncommon cases is the sole pumping element (e.g. the RS-25 low pressure fuel turbopump).

== Inducers ==
Virtually all turbopumps since about 1955 feature inducers, upstream of the impellers. The inducer is an axial, spiral design that raises the fluid pressure enough to prevent cavitation when it reaches the entrance to the impeller. Inducers have their own specialized version of specific speed (like impellers) termed suction specific speed:

$N_{ss} = \frac{N_{RPM} \cdot \sqrt{Q_{gpm}}}{NPSH_{R,ft}^{0.75}} \,\,\,\,\,\,\,\, \omega_{ss} = \frac{\omega_{rad/s} \cdot \sqrt{Q_{m^3/s}}}{(g \cdot NPSH_{R,m})^{0.75}}$

The head pressure that the fluid rises over the length of the inducer is termed the NPSH_{A} (NPSH available). This must be above the NPSH_{R} of the impeller, quantified with suction margin:

$NPSH_{margin} = \frac{NPSH_{A,ind.out}}{NPSH_{R,imp.in}}$

Turbopumps also require a certain NPSH before it even reaches the inducer, again termed the NPSH_{R} (so the inducer and impeller both have their own individual NPSH_{R}). This is achieved by pressurizing the propellant tanks to some extent; a few bar is typical to provide enough suction margin for the inducer itself (separate to the suction margin for the impeller).

Inducers for cryogenic propellants usually cannot be designed to have zero NPSH_{R} because a rocket usually fills cryogenic propellants at their saturated state, meaning NPSH_{A} in the tank is zero. This gives no margin and thus cavitation at the inducer blades becomes likely. This can be improved with subcooled / densified propellants (e.g. Falcon 9), but even here vapor margin is usually low compared to what an inducer requires. Regardless, some tank pressure is often desirable for structural stability of the rocket itself, and so increases the NPSH_{A}, reducing the NPSH_{R} of the inducer (and so probably its axial length) as another benefit.

Suction performance is usually the main limiting factor for shaft speed in turbopumps, even more than bearing limits / turbine burst / seal limits / etc. For this reason an initial sizing of a turbopump often begins with selecting desired inducer performance parameters (flow coefficient, hub-tip ratio, suction margin, flow margin) and then finding shaft speed from this as a derived quantity.

== Volutes and diffusers ==
Liquid leaving the blades of an impeller has very high velocity but relatively low static pressure. This is problematic because pipes can be very lossy at high mean velocities; head loss scales with $v^2$ (see Darcy-Weisbach equation). To prevent large losses as propellants travels from the pump to the main injector (especially through a regenerative cooling jacket), it is highly desirable to significantly slow down the flow. This trades the kinetic energy of the flow into potential energy, realized as a much higher static pressure. The goal of the pump housing is to perform this tradeoff as efficiently as possible with minimal energy loss, and then discharge the fluid smoothly to the rest of the rocket engine.

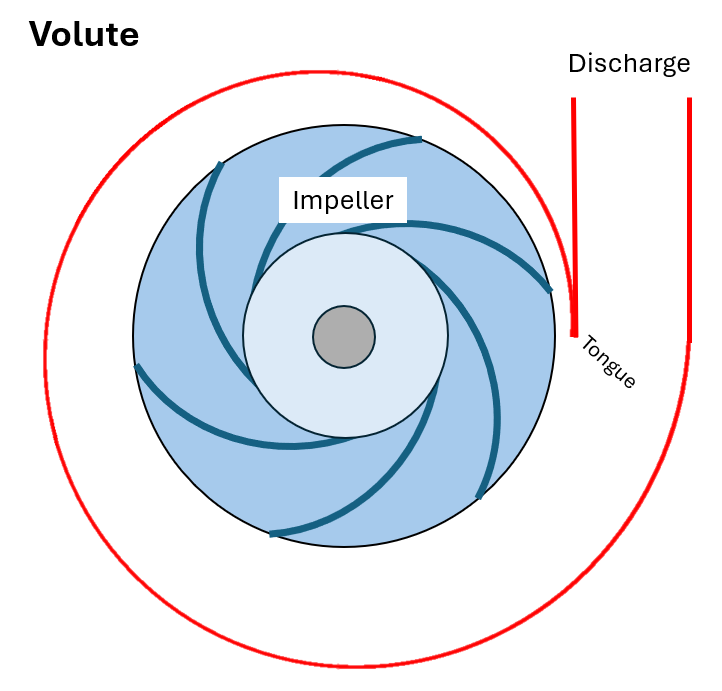
Diagram of a basic pump volute, with no diffuser

The exit fluid passages in a pump housing are usually shaped into a volute design, sometimes with a vaned diffuser between the impeller and the volute. The goal with either is to provide a smooth flow path for fluid to leave the impeller without large pressure variations along its circumference, which can cause large radial loads through the bearings. The goal of the volute itself is not to recover static pressure; this comes later on via a conical diffuser at its discharge. The cross section of a volute smoothly ramps progressively larger along the azimuth of the pump, accepting more and more fluid from the impeller exit along its length. It terminates at a discharge that is piped to the rest of the engine. The separation between the discharge and the rest of the volute is known as the tongue or cutwater.

Volutes should be designed around conservation of mass, and conservation of angular momentum so as not to cause non-uniform accelerations in the flow. A common design strategy is to keep a constant mean velocity $v_{mean}$ through the volute passage, which leads to a linear ramp in cross section area $A$ along the circumferential angle $\theta$. The mean velocity is determined by an inverse relationship from the impeller discharge $v_{tang, out}$ to conserve angular momentum as the radial distance increases.

$A(\theta)=\frac{Q}{v_{mean}}\frac{\theta}{2\pi} \,\,\,\,\,\,\,\,\,\,\,\,\,\, v_{mean}r_{mean}=v_{tang,out}r_{out}$

This becomes an iterative process, as the mean properties are found via integration across the cross section.

== Turbines ==
Turbopumps, by definition, are driven by gas turbines. Because of the high power requirements, these need very high gas flow, and so are always of the axial type (in contrast with radial inflow turbines common in turbochargers). There is a fundamental tradeoff between the turbine's pitchline radius $r$, the shaft speed $\omega$, and the supplied gas flow $\dot{m}$. Improving one factor necessitates making one or both of the others worse to maintain sufficient power output $P_{stage}$ into the shaft and the pump:

$P_{stage} = T\omega = Fr\omega = \eta\cdot\dot{m}v_{pitchline}\omega = \eta\cdot\dot{m}(u_{in}v_{tang,in}-u_{out}v_{tang,out}) = \eta\cdot2\dot{m}u^2 = \eta\cdot2\dot{m}\omega^2r^2$

This is a rearranged form of Euler's turbine equation, assuming the ideal (though often impractical) case of zero post-swirl in the working gas leaving the turbine. Turbines are typically either of an impulse design (common in gas generator and other open cycles) or of a reaction design (common in staged combustion and other closed cycles). They can consist of one or more stages, where each stage has both a stator, which can be bladed or nozzles, and a wheel (sometimes referred to as a rotor in older papers and aero focused papers).

=== Impulse turbines for open cycles ===
Open cycles aim to increase mass efficiency by minimizing mass flow through the turbine, making up for it by maximizing pressure drop. This is because the mass flow is dumped overboard, a performance hit. Comparatively, maximizing pressure drop is easy to do because it dumps to ambient pressure, which will be significantly lower than the gas generator (GG) chamber pressure. This is true even if GG pressure were the same value as the main chamber pressure, which the pumps have to work hard enough to discharge to anyways. These considerations drive the designer towards impulse designs on the turbine, with gas flow expanded via converging-diverging blades or nozzles to supersonic velocities that then impinge on the turbine wheel.

=== Reaction turbines for closed cycles ===
Closed cycles aim to increase efficiency by minimizing pressure drop across the turbine, making up for it by maximizing mass flow. This is because the downstream pressure must be higher than the main chamber pressure. It is often significantly higher because of injector and regen jacket pressure losses. Consequently, the only method for increasing pressure drop is to increase chamber pressure in the preburner much higher than the main chamber. This puts significantly more load on the pumps which must have a high pressure discharge for the preburner. Comparatively, high mass flow is easy to accomplish because none is being dumped overboard - so it is common to route the entire mass flow of one propellant through the preburner and turbine. Full flow staged combustion cycles take this a step further by routing the entire mass flow (hence 'full flow') of both propellants through preburners and turbines, taking advantage of essentially 100% of possible mass flow through the engine to generate shaft power for the turbopumps. These considerations drive the designer towards reaction type designs on the turbine where gas flow is subsonically expelled from, and reacting against, the wheel blades.

== Turbopump System Design ==
Turbopumps have a reputation for being difficult to design for optimal performance; and the tyranny of the rocket equation demands exceptional performance and mass efficiency. Turbopumps in rockets are important and problematic enough, often considered the most technically complex part of the engine, to the point that launch vehicles have been caustically described as a "turbopump with a rocket attached". The turbopumps are the centerpiece of the rocket engine powerhead, one of two major subassemblies making up the whole engine (the other subassembly being the thrust chamber assembly). The rest of the powerhead essentially exists to supply the needs of the turbopump: for example the gas generator or preburner supplies the motive energy; fuel and oxidizer bleeds allow the engine to chill in and the pumps to prime; purge gas manifolds and lines supply the interpropellant seal; throttle valves reduce propellant to the gas generator and thus slow the turbine; recirculation and/or drain lines provide low pressure zones to pull coolant through the bearings (where fuel and/or oxidier serve as a coolant) and pull propellant out of the interpropellant seal's interstitial cavities.

Common problems include:

- Excessive secondary flow leakage from the high-pressure impeller discharge back to the low-pressure inlet along the gap between the casing of the pump and the impeller. This problem is greater in unshrouded impellers (tip leakage) than shrouded designs. This is especially pronounced in inducers, which are almost always unshrouded.
- Excessive recirculation of the fluid at the inlet in the vicinity of the inducer, which can hinder suction performance. Inducers greatly prefer uniform axial flow impinging onto them. .
- Excessive vortexing of propellants in the mainlines as they leaves the pump volute discharges.
- Damaging cavitation to impeller blade surfaces in low-pressure zones, which also causes reduction in head.
- Leakage through seals; especially interpropellant seals, especially with life accumulated wearing.
- Axial shaft thrust imbalances, which can cause excessive wear and failure of seals (for example non contact face seals can come into contact with enough thrust load)

Turbopumps typically require significant testing and iteration to achieve good results. It should be ensured that they can survive a full service life, with significant margin. Some engines also require multiple restarts to be demonstrated; potentially tens to hundreds of restarts in reusable rocket engines. Because of the many transient processes during startup and shutdown, the number of starts accumulated on a turbopump can be just as important as the cumulative runtime for tracking hardware life and wearing. Turbopumps can be susceptible to significant high cycle fatigue (HCF) because they spin so fast - where a resonating turbine wheel is accumulating one or more cycles for every revolution. Even static components can still be susceptible to low cycle fatigue (LCF) over many restarts.

=== Startup ===
Starting a rocket engine is a chicken-and-egg problem: combustion needs to be occurring somewhere (gas generator, preburner, thrust chamber depending on the cycle) in order to drive the turbine and thus spin the pumps, but the pumps need to already be spinning in order to supply the pressurized propellants for sustained combustion. The typical way to overcome this is by briefly supply an external source of stored energy: pressurized spin gas (e.g. nitrogen) routed to the turbine manifold to begin spinning it up. As the turbine begins accelerating, the pumps start supplying meager amounts of propellant for combustion, and the ignition system activates to begin combustion; which then starts supplying some amount of combustion gas as the nitrogen supply drops off, which spins the pumps further, supplying more propellant for combustion, more turbine spinning, etc. This process is known as bootstrapping and lasts on the order of seconds as the engine comes up to full power.

== History ==
=== Invention and early development ===
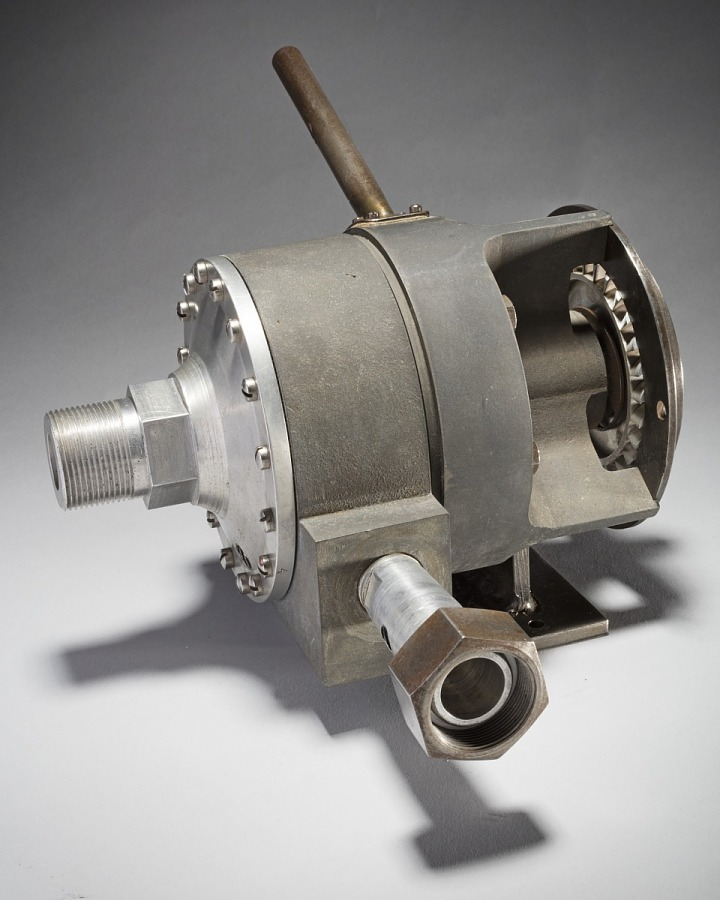
Robert Goddard's turbopump for his "P-Series" rockets. While rudimentary compared to modern practices, notice the pump inlet on the left, pump discharge in the foreground, turbine manifold inlet in the background, and turbine wheel on the right.

High-pressure pumps for large missiles had been discussed by rocket pioneers such as Hermann Oberth as early as the 1920's. The turbopump does not have a clear undisputed inventor. Rather they were developed independently in the United States and Germany in the 1930s, where each team had little to no knowledge of the other. The earliest prototype of a turbopump of any kind appears from the historical record to be by the American Robert Goddard and his team, circa 1934. These early turbopump tests were not successful, as it ran straight into the fundamental problem of turbopumps: the turbine was driven directly off of the main combustion chamber gas, and it quickly melted. Using this knowledge, Goddard iterated and gradually invented the gas generator cycle, culminating in a new turbopump that successfully propelled his "P-Series" (pump series) rocket on a flight in 1940 using liquid oxygen and gasoline.

This flight, however, was already preempted by a successful one in Germany (albeit monopropellant; Goddard's turbopump would have been the first bipropellant one to fly). Hellmuth Walker began development of turbopumps for rocket power aircraft in 1937, and achieved a successful first flight of the aircraft RII-203 in 1939 using hydrogen peroxide monopropellant. This was quickly followed the same year by the DFS 194 and the He 176. These were found to have disappointing thrust values, which was traced back to poor suction performance causing significant cavitation in the impellers. This spurred the invention of the inducer, which was added to all subsequent Walker turbopumps; notably soon after for the Messerschmitt Me 163 Komet, the only rocket-powered aircraft to ever be used in active combat.

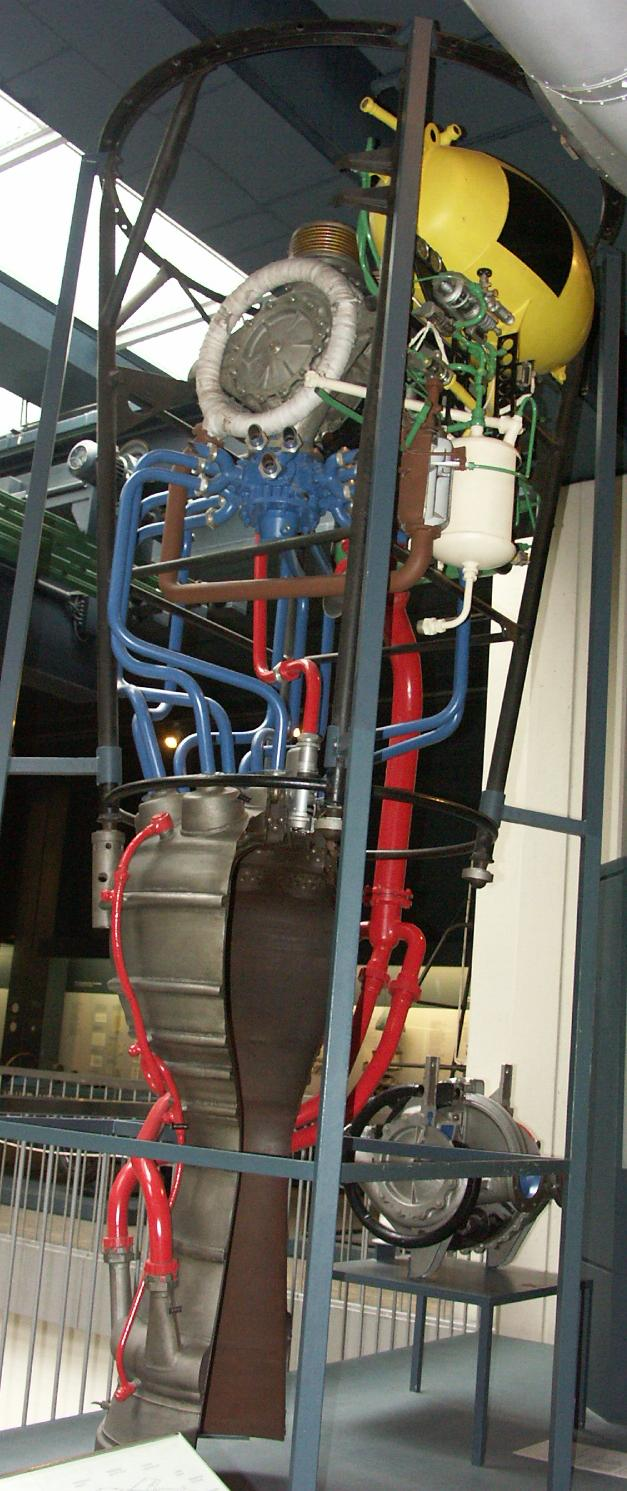
The V-2 rocket used a circular turbopump to pressurize the propellant.

In mid-1935 Wernher von Braun had initiated a fuel pump project at the southwest German firm Klein, Schanzlin & Becker that was experienced in building large fire-fighting pumps. This would evolve by around 1940 into the V-2 rocket design, which used hydrogen peroxide decomposed through a Walter steam generator to power the turbopump which pumped ethanol and liquid oxygen into the bipropellant combustion chamber. This was a major advance in the scale of turbopumps compared to the Me-163. The first engine fired successfully in 1942, and on August 16, 1942, a trial rocket stopped in mid-air and crashed due to a failure in the turbopump. The first successful V-2 launch was shortly after on October 3, 1942.

=== Postwar acceleration ===
Turbopump development in the Soviet Union began in earnest in 1943, and achieved a successful first flight by 1947; accelerated towards the end by knowledge gained from the Me-163 and V-2 programs via Operation Osoaviakhim.

Similarly, turbopump development in the US accelerated from the experimental designs of Goddard into a much larger industrial effort via expertise gained through Operation Paperclip. Around this time serious effort was put into the development of liquid hydrogen as a propellant - spearheaded by a program for turbopump development at Aerojet led by George Bosco. During the second half of 1947, Bosco and his group learned about the pump work of others and made preliminary design studies. Aerojet representatives visited Ohio State University where Florant was working on hydrogen pumps, and consulted Dietrich Singelmann, a German pump expert at Wright Field. Bosco subsequently used Singelmann's data in designing Aerojet's first hydrogen pump. By mid-1948, Aerojet had selected centrifugal pumps for both liquid hydrogen and liquid oxygen. They obtained some German radial-vane pumps from the Navy and tested them during the second half of the year. By the end of 1948, Aerojet had designed, built, and tested a liquid hydrogen pump (15 cm diameter). Initially, it used ball bearings that were run clean and dry, because the cryogenic temperature made conventional lubrication impractical.

The pump was first operated at low shaft speeds to allow its parts to chill in to its cryogenic operating temperature. Once chilled, an attempt was made to accelerate shaft speed from 5000 to 35000 rpm. Both the bearings and the impeller quickly failed. A new attempt implemented precision bearings, lubricated by an atomized stream of oil and nitrogen. On the next run, the bearings worked satisfactorily but the brazed impeller flew apart from the stresses; a new one was then milled from aluminum. The next two runs with the new pump ran but showed generated no significant flow or head. This was traced to the exit diffuser which was small and insufficiently cooled, limiting flow rate. This was corrected by adding vent holes in the pump housing; which were opened during chill down to let air escape quickly. With this fix, two successful runs were made in March 1949: a flow rate of 0.25 kg/s and discharge pressure of 26 bar approximately agreed with predictions.

=== Later iteration ===
Gas generator cycles dominated engine design from the Goddard early days through the 1960s (with a handful of early engines like the V-2 and derivatives being a catalyst-driven cycle more specifically). The American RL10 saw the advent of the expander cycle in 1962, and the Soviet RD-253 was the beginning of the staged combustion cycle in 1965. The American J-2S (a derivative of the GG cycle J-2) pioneered the tap-off cycle in a late 1960s test campaign, though it never flew.

The RS-25 took the staged combustion cycle to new heights. These would serve as the space shuttle main engines (SSME), and their turbopumps spun at over 30,000 rpm, delivering 150 lb/s (68 kg/s) of liquid hydrogen and 896 lbm/s (406 kg/s) of liquid oxygen to the engine. It technically featured four separate turbopumps; with both the ox side and fuel side featuring a smaller boost pump before their main pumps, to increase suction performance in a design demanding very high head / shaft speeds.

While not technically a turbopump (in that it lacks a turbine), the Electron rocket's Rutherford became the first engine to use an electrically-driven pump in flight in 2018.

== Turbopump examples ==
| Engine | Cycle | Fuel | Oxidizer | Pump type | Shafts | Shaft speed, RPM | Outlet pressure, barA | Turbine stages | Geared |
|---|---|---|---|---|---|---|---|---|---|
| F-1 | Gas generator | RP-1 | LOX | Radial | Single | 5488 | 110 / 128 | 2 | No |
| RS-25 / SSME | Fuel rich staged (Note: The low pressure fuel turbopump of the RS-25 is technically driven via expander cycle) | Hydrogen | LOX | Axial/radial | Quad | 36000 HPFTP / 16185 LPFTP / 28120 HPOTP / 5150 LPOTP | 357 / 585 | 4 / 6 | No |
| RS-68 | Gas generator | Hydrogen | LOX | Radial | Dual | 21000 / 8700 | | 2 / 2 | No |
| J-2 | Gas generator | Hydrogen | LOX | Axial/radial | Dual | 27130 / 8753 | 77 / 85 | 2 / 2 | No |
| RL10 | Expander (closed) | Hydrogen | LOX | Radial | Dual | 30250 / 12100 | 41 / 68 | 2 | Yes |
| RD-107 | Catalyst gas generator | RP-1 | LOX | Radial | Single (Note: The RD-107 technically has two more secondary shafts to pump hydrogen peroxide and nitrogen) | | | 1 | Yes |
| RD-180 | Ox rich staged | RP-1 | LOX | Radial | Triple | | | 1 | No |
| RD-275 | Ox rich staged | N_{2}O_{4} | UDMH | Radial | Single | | | | No |
| YF-100 | Ox rich staged | RP-1 | LOX | Radial | Triple | | | | No |
| Merlin | Gas generator | RP-1 | LOX | Radial | Single | | | 1 | No |
| Raptor | Full flow staged | Methane | LOX | Radial | Dual | | | | No |
| Archimedes | Ox rich staged | Methane | LOX | Radial | Single | | | | No |
| Rutherford (Note: Technically Rutherford is not a turbopump because it does not have a turbine. Shown for comparison) | Electric | RP-1 | LOX | Radial | Dual | | | | No |
| Reaver | Tap-off | RP-1 | LOX | Radial | Single | | | | No |
| Lightning | Tap-off | RP-1 | LOX | Radial | Single | | | 1 | No |
| E-2 | Ox rich staged | RP-1 | LOX | Radial | Single | 30000 | | | No |
| Aeon-R | Gas generator | Methane | LOX | Radial | Dual | | | 1 / 1 | No |
| Hadley | Ox rich staged | RP-1 | LOX | Radial | Single | | | | No |
| Zenith | Full flow staged | Methane | LOX | Radial | Dual | | | | No |

Where two values are given, fuel side listed first and oxidizer side listed second.

== See also ==
- Turboexpander
- Gas-generator cycle
- Staged combustion cycle
- Expander cycle
- Components of jet engines
