= Brian Barnett =

Brian Barnett may refer to:

- Bryan Barnett (born 1987), Canadian sprinter
- Brian Barnett Duff (1930–2016), United States district judge
- M. Brian Barnett, CEO of Solstar
