= Walter Anderson (businessman) =

American telecommunications entrepreneur

Walter C. Anderson (born 1953) is an American entrepreneur, investor, and advocate for commercial space travel. He began his career in telecommunications and founded several companies including Mid-Atlantic Telecom in 1984 and Esprit Telecom in 1992, which were acquired by Frontier Communications and Global TeleSystems Group, respectively. He co-founded the International Space University and provided financial support for the Space Frontier Foundation during its creation. Anderson also invested in a number of space ventures including Rotary Rocket, a company that attempted to develop a reusable, single-stage launch vehicle with the aid of helicopter rotors. He founded MirCorp, an unsuccessful venture to privatize the Mir space station, and Orbital Recovery Corporation, a company developing technology to capture and repair telecommunication satellites.

In the mid-2000s, Anderson pled guilty to charges of tax evasion and was sentenced to nine years in prison. After his release in 2012, he founded Avealto a company developing a fleet of high-altitude platforms.

== Early life ==
Walter C. Anderson was born Walter Anderson Crump in 1953. He grew up in Washington, D.C.

== Career ==
Anderson began his career in the telecommunications industry at MCI Communications in 1979. He founded Mid-Atlantic Telecom in 1984. Mid-Atlantic Telecom was a long-distance telephone service carrier. The company was the first to combine telephone and voicemail services. Anderson served as president and chairman of the Mid-Atlantic Telecom until the early 1990s when the company was acquired by Rochester Telephone Corporation (now Frontier Communications).

In 1988, Anderson co-founded the International Space University as an early investor. He provided financial support for the Space Frontier Foundation during its creation in 1991. The following year, he founded Esprit Telecom based in London, taking advantage of early telecom deregulation in the U.K. Anderson served as chairman of the company until November 1998. The following month, Global TeleSystems Group, a US publicly traded company, acquired Esprit for nearly $1 billion. Anderson was also a major shareholder of Telco Communications Group before its acquisition by Excel Communications for $1.2 billion.

In the mid to late 1990s, Anderson was an early investor in Erol's Internet, which expanded into one of the largest dial-up ISPs. Erol's was acquired by RCN Corporation in 1998, netting Anderson stock in RCN worth $25 million. The same year, Anderson became chairman of Worldxchange Communications. He served in the position until December 2000 when the company was sold to World Access. He also served as chairman of Covista Communications from 1999 to 2001.

Anderson had been an ardent supporter of the development of commercial space activities. He was an early-stage investor in many private space ventures in the 1990s and early 2000s, and one of the first "astropreneurs". His highest-profile space investment was MirCorp, the late 1990s start-up that briefly privatized Russia's aging Mir space station. He reportedly invested as much as $30 million into the venture. From 1996 and 1999, Anderson was also an investor in Rotary Rocket, a now-defunct venture to develop a reusable single-stage-to-orbit crewed spacecraft that hoped to combine the rotors of a helicopter with rocketry to achieve orbit. In the early 2000s, Anderson also founded and served as CEO of Orbital Recovery Corporation, a company developing technology to capture and repair telecommunication satellites.

In the mid-2000s, he was accused of not reporting income from investments in non-US companies. Anderson was arrested on February 26, 2005, at Dulles International Airport as he was returning from London. He was held in the Washington, D.C. jail for more than 2 years, before he pled guilty to some of the charges against him in September 2006. He was sentenced to nine years in prison in March 2007. In June 2007, federal district judge Paul L. Friedman ruled that Anderson would not have to pay any restitution to the federal government due to a typographical error by the government in the plea agreement but Anderson would still have to pay restitution to the District of Columbia government. Anderson was released at the end of 2012 after serving the last few months of his term at home in Virginia.

In September 2007, Anderson was named by the New Scientist as one of the "Top 10 Influential Space Thinkers". He was also featured in Orphans of Apollo, a documentary about MirCorp.

In 2013, Anderson founded Avealto Ltd., based in the UK. Avealto was founded to finance, construct and operate a fleet of high-altitude platforms. Since then, the company has gained an airworthiness certification for the FAA for a 28-meter-long test vehicle. The final design developed by Anderson and co-founder David Chambers is a 100-meter-long helium airship with a payload of telecommunications equipment. The airship would float in a stationary position guided by GPS tracking.
