= Gafi =

Gafi or GAFI may refer to:

- Financial Action Task Force on Money Laundering or Groupe d'action financière, an intergovernmental organization founded in 1989
- General Administration of Financial Investigations, an intelligence agency in Saudi Arabia
- Great American Faunal Interchange: the Great American Interchange, movement of animal species

== See also ==
- GAFIA, a term used in science fiction fandom
