= Rotary Rocket =

American rocketry company

Coordinates: 35.055321°N 118.158375°W

Rotary Rocket Company

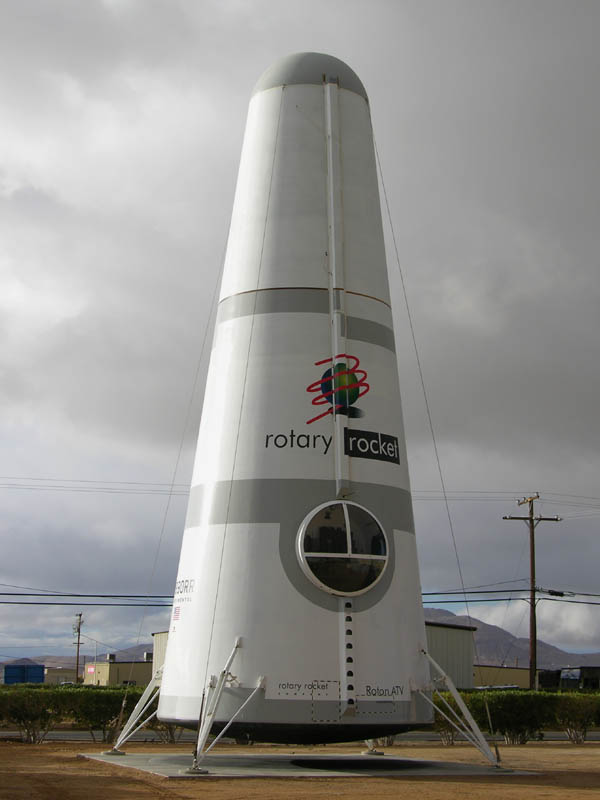
- The Rotary Rocket Roton ATV on permanent display at the Mojave Spaceport
- Industry: Aerospace
- Founded: 1996
- Defunct: 2001
- Key people: Gary Hudson (CEO, board); Bevin McKinney (CTO, board); Frederick Giarrusso (CFO, board); Anne Hudson (CAO); Walt Anderson (board); Tom Clancy (board)
- Products: Roton

Rotary Rocket Company was a rocketry company that developed the Roton helicopter-rocket hybrid concept in the late 1990s as a fully reusable single-stage-to-orbit (SSTO) crewed spacecraft. The design was initially conceived by Bevin McKinney, who shared it with Gary Hudson. In 1996, Rotary Rocket Company was formed to commercialize the concept. The Roton was intended to reduce costs of launching payloads into low Earth orbit by a factor of ten.

The company gathered considerable venture capital from angel investors and opened a factory headquartered in a 45,000-square-foot (4,200 m^{2}) facility at Mojave Air and Space Port in Mojave, California. The fuselage for their vehicles was made by Scaled Composites, at the same airport, while the company developed the novel engine design and helicopter-like landing system. A full-scale test vehicle made three hover flights in 1999, but the company exhausted its funds and closed in early 2001.

== Origins ==
Bevin McKinney had been thinking about the idea of a launch vehicle using helicopter blades for several years, when Wired magazine asked Gary Hudson to write an article on the concept. The resulting article resulted in a commitment of funding from billionaire Walt Anderson, which was combined with an initial investment from author Tom Clancy and allowed the company to get started. Hudson and McKinney were joined by co-founders Frederick Giarrusso, Dan DeLong, James Grote, Tom Brosz, and Anne Hudson, who together launched the company in October 1996.

== Design evolution ==
=== Helicopter to orbit ===
Gary Hudson's and Bevin McKinney's initial concept was to merge a launch vehicle with a helicopter: spinning rotor blades, powered by tip jets, would lift the vehicle in the earliest stage of launch. Once the air density thinned to the point that helicopter flight was impractical, the vehicle would continue its ascent on pure rocket power, with the rotor acting as a giant turbopump.

Calculations showed that the helicopter blades modestly increased the effective specific impulse (I_{sp}) by approximately 20–30 seconds, essentially only carrying the blades into orbit "for free". Thus, there was no overall gain from this method during ascent. However, the blades could be used to soft land the vehicle, so its landing system carried no additional cost.

One problem found during research at Rotary was that once the vehicle left the atmosphere additional thrust would be necessary. Thus multiple engines would be needed at the base as well as at the rotor tips.

This initial version of the Roton had been designed with the small communications satellite market in mind. However, this market crashed, signaled by the failure of Iridium Communications. Consequently, the Roton concept needed to be redesigned for heavier payloads.

=== Helicopter from orbit ===
The revised and redesigned Roton concept was a cone-shaped launch vehicle, with a helicopter rotor on top for use only during landing. An internal cargo bay could be used both for carrying payloads to orbit and bringing others back to Earth. The projected price to orbit of this design was given as $1,000 per kg of payload, less than one-tenth of the then-current launch price. Payload capacity was limited to a relatively modest 6,000 pounds (2,700 kg).

The revised version would have used a unique rotating annular aerospike engine: the engine and base of the launch vehicle would spin at high speed (720 rpm) to pump fuel and oxidizer to the rim by the rotation. Unlike the landing rotor, due to the shallow angle of the nozzles in the base rotor, the rotation speed self limited and required no control system. Since the density of the LOX (liquid oxygen) was higher than that of the kerosene, extra pressure was available with the LOX, so it would have been used to cool the engine's throat and other components, rather than using the kerosene as the coolant as in a conventional LOX/kerosene rocket. However, at the high G levels at the outer edge of the rotating engine block, clarity on how LOX would work as a coolant was both unknown and difficult to validate. That added one layer of risk.

In addition, the rotating exhaust acted as a wall at the outer edge of the engine base, lowering the temperature of the base to below ambient due to ejector pump effect and creating a suction cup at the bottom in atmosphere. This could be alleviated using makeup gas to develop base pressure, requiring an additional rocket engine to fill up the base of the main rocket engine. (Similar problems would have occurred in a conventional aerospike engine, but there, natural recirculation plus use of the turbopump gas-generator's exhaust as the makeup gas would have largely alleviated the problem "for free.")

At the rim, 96 miniature jets would exhaust the burning propellants (LOX and kerosene) around the rim of the base of the vehicle, which gained the vehicle extra thrust at high altitude – acting as a zero-length truncated aerospike nozzle. A similar system with non-rotating engines was studied for the N1 rocket. That application had a much smaller base area, and did not create the suction effect a larger peripheral engine induces. The Roton engine had a projected vacuum I_{SP} (specific impulse) of ~355 seconds (3.48 km/s), which is very high for a LOX/kerosene engine – and a thrust to weight ratio of 150, which is extremely light.

During reentry, the base also served as a water-cooled heatshield. This was theoretically a good way to survive reentry, particularly for a lightweight reusable vehicle. However, using water as a coolant would require converting it into superheated steam, at high temperatures and pressures, and there were concerns about micrometeorite damage on orbit puncturing the pressure vessel, causing the reentry shield to fail. These concerns were resolved using a failure-resistant massively redundant flow system, created using thin metal sheets chemically etched with a pattern of micropores forming a channel system that was robust against failure and damage.

In addition, cooling was achieved two different ways; one way was the vaporization of the water, but the second was even more significant, and was due to the creation of a layer of "cool" steam surrounding the base surface, reducing the ability to heat. Further, the water metering system would have to be extremely reliable, giving one drop per second per square inch, and was achieved via a trial/error design approach on real hardware. By the end of the Roton program, some hardware had been built and tested. The reentry trajectory was to be trimmed, similar to the Soyuz, to minimize the G loads on the passengers. And the ballistic coefficient was better for the Roton and could be better tailored. When the Soyuz trim system failed and it went full ballistic, the G levels did rise significantly but without incident to the passengers.

The vehicle was also unique in planning to use its helicopter-style rotors for landing, rather than wings or parachutes. This concept allowed controlled landings (unlike parachutes), and it was 1/5 the weight of fixed wings. Another advantage was that a helicopter could land almost anywhere, whereas winged spaceplanes such as the Space Shuttle had to make it back to the runway. The rotor blades were to be powered by peroxide tip rockets. The rotor blades were to be deployed before reentry; some questions were raised about whether the blades would survive until landing.

The initial plan was to have them almost vertical, but that was found to be unstable as they needed to drop lower and lower and spin faster for stability, the heating rates went up dramatically and the air flow became more head on. The implication of that was that the blades went from a lightly heated piece of hardware to one that either had to be actively cooled or made of SiC or other refractory material. The idea of popping out the blades became much more attractive at this point, and initial studies were made for that option. This rotor design concept was not without precedent. In 1955, one of five Soviet designs for planned suborbital piloted missions was to include rocket-tipped rotors as its landing system. On May 1, 1958, these plans were dropped as a decision was made to proceed directly to orbital flights.

Rotary Rocket designed and pressure-tested an exceptionally lightweight but strong composite LOX tank. It survived a test program which involved it being pressure cycled and ultimately deliberately shot to test its ignition sensitivity.

=== A new engine ===
In June 1999, Rotary Rocket announced that it would use a derivative of the Fastrac engine under development at NASA's Marshall Space Flight Center, instead of the company's own unconventional spinning engine design. Reportedly, the company had been unable to convince investors that its engine design was viable; the composite structure and gyrocopter reentry was an easier sell.

At the same time as this change, the company laid off about a third of its employees, lowering approximate headcount from 60 to 40. At this point, the company planned to begin its commercial launch service sometime in 2001. Although the company had raised $30 million, it still needed to raise an additional $120 million before entering service.

== Atmospheric Test Vehicle (ATV) ==
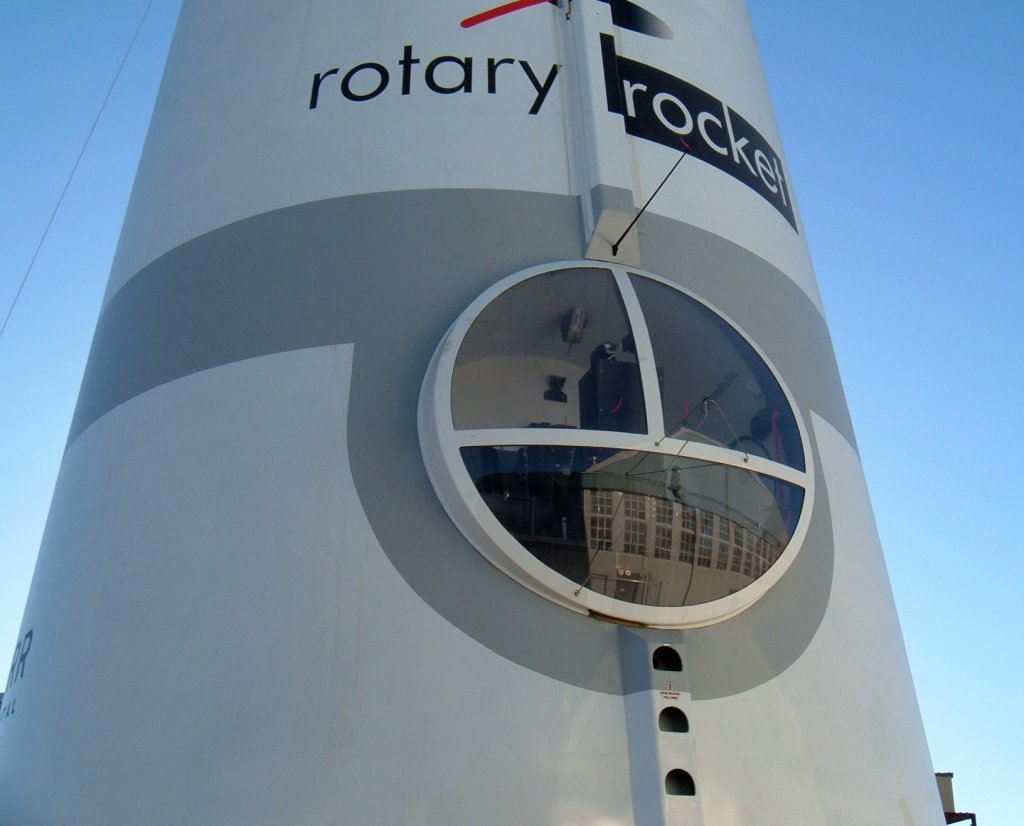
The ATV's cockpit was nicknamed the 'Batcave' by its pilots because of its restricted field of view.

A full size, 63 ft (19 m) tall, Atmospheric Test Vehicle (ATV) was built under contract by Scaled Composites for use in hover test flights. The $2.8 million ATV was not intended as an all-up test article, since it had no rocket engine and no heat shielding. The ATV was rolled out of its Mojave hangar on March 1, 1999, bearing an FAA registry of N990RR.

The rotor head was salvaged from a crashed Sikorsky S-58, at a price of $50,000 – as opposed to as much as $1 million for a new head. Each rotor was powered by a 350-lbf (1,560 N) hydrogen peroxide jet, as intended for the orbital vehicle. The rotor assemblage was tested in a rock quarry before installation on the ATV.

The ATV flew three successful test flights in 1999. The pilot for these three flights was Marti Sarigul-Klijn and the copilot was Brian Binnie (who later gained fame as pilot of Scaled Composites' SpaceShipOne on its second X-Prize flight).

The ATV made its first flight on July 28. This flight consisted of three vertical hops totaling 4 min 40 sec in duration and reaching a maximum altitude of 8 ft (2.4 m). The pilots found the flying extremely challenging for a number of reasons. Visibility in the cockpit was so restricted that the pilots nicknamed it the Batcave. The view of the ground was entirely obstructed, so the pilots had to rely on a sonar altimeter to judge ground proximity. The entire craft had a low rotational inertia, and torque from the spinning rotor blades made the body spin, unless counteracted by yaw thrust in the opposite direction.

The second flight, on September 16, was a continuous hover flight lasting 2 min 30 sec, reaching a maximum altitude of 20 ft (6.1 m). The sustained flight was made possible by the installation of more powerful rotor tip thrusters and an autothrottle.

The third and last flight was made on October 12. The ATV flew down the flightline at Mojave Air and Space Port, covering 4,300 ft (1,310 m) in its flight and rising to a maximum altitude of 75 ft (23 m). The speed was as high as 53 mph (85 km/h). This test revealed some instability in translational flight.

A fourth test was planned to simulate a full autorotative descent. The ATV would climb to an altitude 10,000 ft (3,050 m) under its own power, before throttling back and returning for a soft landing. At this point, given that further funding was then unlikely, safety considerations prevented the test being attempted.

== Criticism of the design ==
Rotary Rocket failed due to lack of funding, but some have suggested that the design itself was inherently flawed.

The Rotary Rocket did fly three test flights and a composite propellant tank survived a full test program, however these tests revealed problems. For instance, the ATV demonstrated that landing the Rotary Rocket was tricky, even dangerous. Test pilots have a rating system, the Cooper-Harper rating scale, for vehicles between 1 and 10 that relates to difficulty to pilot. The Roton ATV scored a 10 — the vehicle simulator was found to be almost unflyable by anyone except the Rotary test pilots, and even then there were short periods where the vehicle was out of control.

Other aspects of the flight plan remained unproven and it is unknown whether Roton could have developed sufficient performance to reach orbit with a single stage, and return – although on paper this might have been possible.

== Last days ==
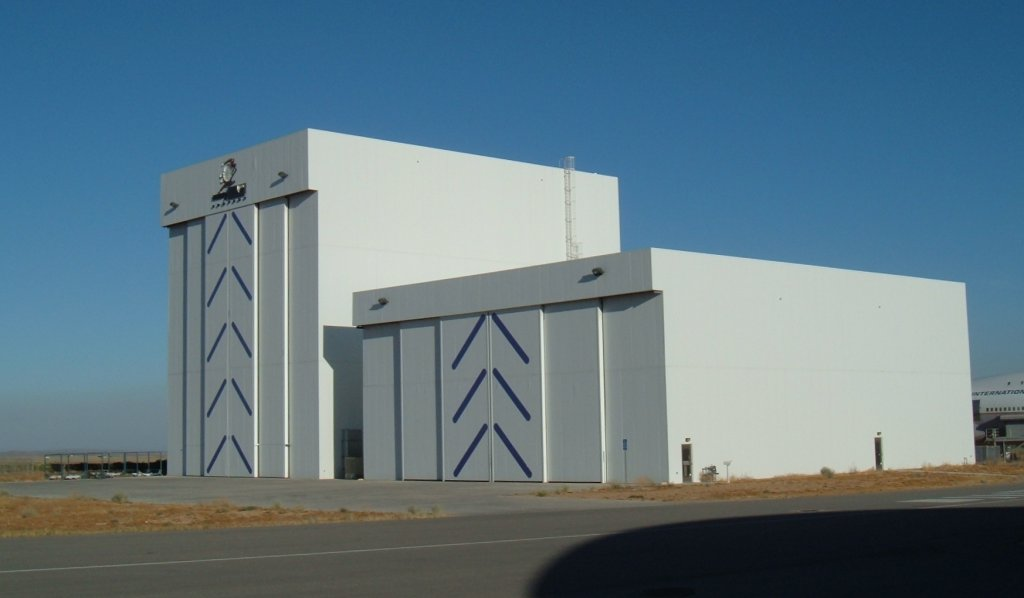
The Rotary Rocket Hangars at Mojave Air and Space Port, as seen in 2005. The taller hangar on the left was the Rotary Rocket Assembly Building.

Engine development ceased in 2000, reportedly two weeks before a full-scale test was due. The vehicle failed to secure launch contracts and Rotary Rocket closed in 2001.

The timing of the venture was unfortunate: the Iridium Communications venture was nearing bankruptcy, and the space industry in general was experiencing financial stress. Ultimately, the company did not attract sufficient funding – even though numerous individuals provided a total of $33 million of support, including writer Tom Clancy.

The Atmospheric Test Vehicle was to be displayed at Classic Rotors Museum, a helicopter museum near San Diego, California, but an attempt to move it there on May 9, 2003, via a short-line sling-load under an Army Reserve CH-47 Chinook failed when the Roton began to oscillate at airspeeds above 35 knots (65 km/h). Instead, the vehicle was kept at Mojave, and on November 10, 2006, the Roton was moved to its permanent display location at the intersection of Airport Blvd and Sabovich Road.

== Roton C-9 specifications ==
Data from

General characteristics

- Capacity: 7,000 lb (3,200 kg) of payload
- Length: 64 ft (20 m)
- Diameter: 22 ft (6.7 m)
- Gross weight: 400,000 lb (181,437 kg)
- Fuel capacity: 372,500 lb (169,000 kg)
- Powerplant: 72 × Rotary RocketJet rocket engines, 6,950 lbf (30.9 kN) thrust each in vacuum
- Specific impulse: 340 s (3.3 km/s)
- Burn time: 253 s

Performance

- Range: 120 mi (190 km, 100 nmi)

== See also ==
- Hiller Hornet, a helicopter with ramjets mounted on the rotor blade tips.
