= Solstar =

Solstar Space Co.
- Founded: March 2017
- Founders: M. Brian Barnett (Founder), Michael Potter and Mark Matossian (Co-founders)
- Headquarters: Santa Fe, New Mexico
- Key people: M. Brian Barnett (CEO); Mark Matossian (COO)
- Number of employees: 11 (July 2018)
- Website: https://www.solstarspace.com/

Solstar Space Co., also known as Solstar, is an American company that provides commercial wireless internet services to space travelers and Internet of Things in space. It also provides a two-way internet link connecting people on earth to technology in space. Based out of Santa Fe, New Mexico, the company was founded in March 2017.

== History ==
Solstar was founded by M. Brian Barnett in March 2017, with Michael Potter and Mark Matossian as co-founders. Prior to this, Barnett had developed an initial design of a communication system which was used to successfully transmit the first-ever commercial text message from earth to space in November 2013, with students from Albuquerque sending 16 messages to a device aboard a UP Aerospace rocket launched from Spaceport America.

In 2017, Solstar received a Phase I small business contract with NASA to develop a preliminary design for a commercial router on the International Space Station, under the Small Business Innovation Research (SBIR) program. The device is intended for low Earth orbit service and was named the Slayton Space Communicator (SC-Slayton) after one of Mercury astronauts Deke Slayton who was NASA's first Chief of the Astronaut Office. The company also signed a Space Act Agreement with NASA to test WiFi technologies in space.

In April 2018, Solstar tested the Schmitt Space Communicator SC-1x, a three-pound device, in a Blue Origin capsule on a New Shepard rocket which was launched from the Blue Origin's launch facility near Van Horn, Texas, and reached a height of 66 miles. The test was successful, with the founder Barnett using the on-flight internet connection to send out a tweet. The project's US$2 million cost was partly funded by NASA as part of its Flight Opportunities program. The device is named after Harrison Schmitt, one of the last men to walk on the Moon and Solstar's adviser. It conducted a second successful test in July 2018, with the flight reaching a peak height of 73.8 miles above sea level. The device was accepted to the Smithsonian National Air and Space Museum's collection.

The April 2018 test footage was featured in a short documentary, The Digital Nomad and the Scientist, detailing the first commercial WiFi service in space. The film was directed by Maclovia Martel and Kristina Korsholm with Michael Potter as the executive producer. The documentary was selected for the Independent Filmmakers Showcase (May 2019) in Los Angeles and got shortlisted to the Ekko Shortlist (Denmark, 2020).

=== Funding ===
In June 2018, Solstar sought Securities and Exchange Commission's approval to raise investment capital through the crowdfunding platform Wefunder. The astronaut Charles D. Walker, who flew on three Space Shuttle flights, joined Solstar as an adviser. By November that year, the company had raised over US$200,000 through Wefunder and US$300,000 from other investors. The Wefunder round closed in January 2019 with US$331,460 raised from a total of 519 investors.
