= ProSpace =

Nonprofit citizens space advocacy group

ProSpace is a nonprofit citizens space advocacy group.

Annually, these members speak to the congressional leaders in an attempt to open space for the average citizen. One such initiative is expanding the use of prize competitions that would spur space innovations and the creation of a National Space Prize Board (NSPB).

ProSpace helped push the passage of space-related legislative initiatives, among these are the Commercial Space Act of 1998, space solar power programs, and technology development for the reusable launch system.

Every year in March many of the group's members travel to Washington, D.C. for an event called "March Storm."

== See also ==
- National Space Society
- Space colonization
- Space Frontier Foundation
- Vision for Space Exploration
