= GAFIA =

GAFIA (along with derived forms such as gafiate and gafiation) is a term used by science fiction fans. It began as an acronym for "Getting Away From It All", and referred initially to escaping from mundane activities via fanac (fan activity).

However, its meaning was soon reversed, and thereafter it referred to getting away from fandom and fannish doings. This can be either a temporary or a long-term separation. The 1959 Fancyclopedia says:

This useful phrase was originally an escapist slogan, meaning the intent to withdraw from the Macrocosm to indulge in some intense fanac, but has undergone a complete reversal of significance so that now "that flash of sanity known as Gafia" refers to a vacation from fandom back in the world of normalcy, where nobody reads that crazy Buck Rogers stuff. Diagnostic symptoms are sheer boredom while trying to read proz or fanzines, allowing correspondence to pile up unanswered, and wishing that half-finished fanzines could be forgotten for a while.

A term closely related is "Fafia" or "Fafiation", from the acronym for "Forced away from it all." To fafiate is to decrease doing fannish activities, not because one prefers to do so, but rather because one is obliged to do so, usually due to lack of time. "Dafia", or "Drifting away from it all", has been proposed as an intermediate term, but is not in general fannish use.

There are many fanzines using the term as a title: Ted White, Redd Boggs and Carl Brandon published science fiction fanzines titled Gafia, Gafia Advertiser and Gafiac. respectively, and there are many more.

The term is among the fannish expressions used most extensively in the book Fallen Angels, by Larry Niven, Jerry Pournelle and Michael Flynn, whose major protagonists are mostly fans (active, covert, gafiated or fafiated).
