= Gary Hudson (engineer) =

American engineer

- Gary Hudson speaking at the first Freeland Conference (1983), sponsored mainly by Rampart Institute
- Engineering career
- Discipline: Private spaceflight
- Practice name: Rotary Rocket Company

Gary Hudson (born 1949/1950) has been involved in private spaceflight development since 1970, for over 40 years.

== Biography ==
Gary Hudson is currently Co-Founder and Chief Architect of Gravitics, Inc. a space station manufacturing company. Mr. Hudson is also Executive Chairman of Oisin Biotechnologies, Inc. & President/Trustee of the Space Studies Institute. Previously, Hudson was the founder of Rotary Rocket Company, which in spending ~$30 Million attempted to build a unique single stage to orbit launch vehicle known as the Roton. Rotary Rocket built a landing test simulator (the Roton ATV) which flew three successful test flights in 1999. The book "They All Laughed at Christopher Columbus - An Incurable Dreamer Builds the First Civilian Spaceship" by Elizabeth Weil is about the Roton project and Gary Hudson.

He also helped found Transformational Space T/Space in 2004.

He also helped found AirLaunch LLC which was awarded the DARPA/USAF FALCON project in 2003.

Previous projects included designs of the Phoenix SSTO, the Percheron, and other rockets, founder of Pacific American Launch Systems, and various consulting projects.

Currently, he is the president and CEO of the Space Studies Institute.

Hudson appears as a character in the novel Fallen Angels, along with his Phoenix SSTO.

Hudson is also a founding partner of Oisin Biotechnologies, which is developing a liposomally-delivered suicide gene senolytic therapy (a treatment that removes senescent cells from the body). Hudson provided an initial seed donation to help fund the creation of the SENS Research Foundation.

== See also ==
- Roton SSTO
- T/space
- Ansari X Prize
- Percheron (rocket)
