= Inducer (pump component) =

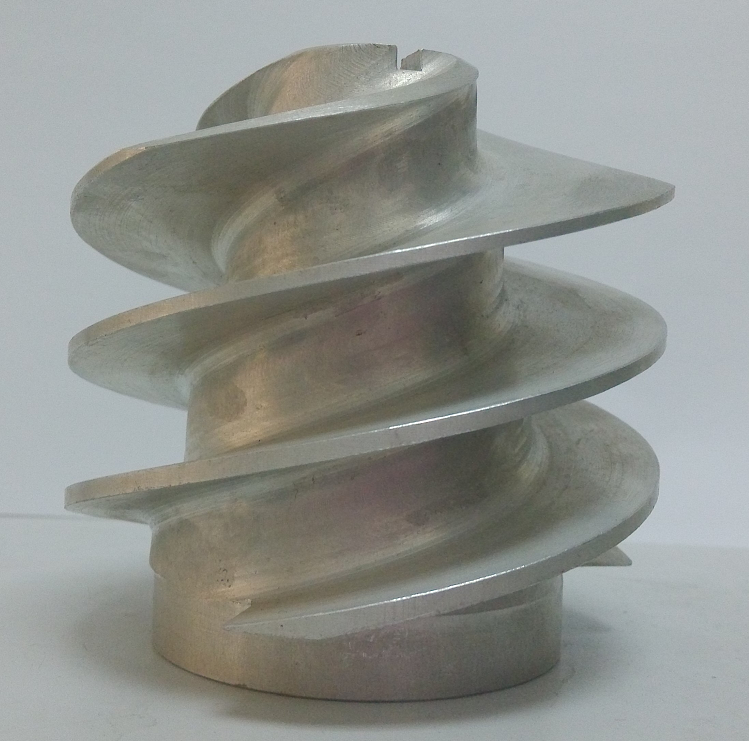
An inducer designed for testing in water tunnels

An inducer is the axial inlet portion of a centrifugal pump rotor, the function of which is to raise the inlet head by an amount sufficient to prevent significant cavitation in the following pump stage. It is used in applications in which the inlet pressure of a pump is close to the vapor pressure of the pumped liquid. Inducers are virtually always included in the turbopumps for liquid propellant rocket engines, although they are also used in other applications which require high suction performance.

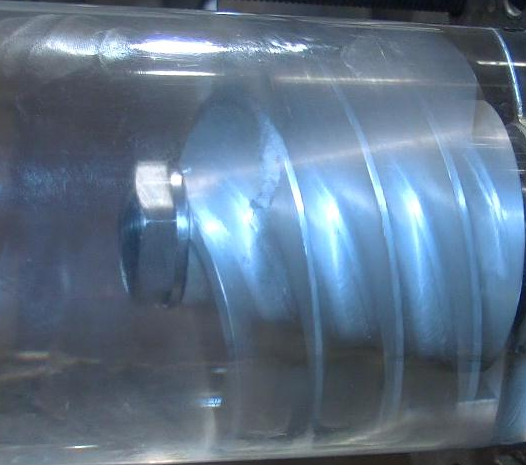
An inducer operating in an experimental water tunnel. The tip vortex cavitation phenomenon can be clearly identified.

== Design parameters ==
Inducers are meant to increase the suction performance of a pump to the point that little to no cavitation occurs in its impeller. The key performance metrics of an inducer is its suction specific speed N_{ss} and its flow coefficient Φ (analogous to, but not the same as, the discharge coefficient in pipe flow).

$\omega_{ss} = \frac{\omega \cdot \sqrt{Q}}{(g \cdot NPSH_{R})^{0.75}} = \sqrt{\pi}\cdot2^{0.75} \frac{\sqrt{\phi(1-\nu^2)}}{\tau^{0.75}}$

$N_{ss} = \frac{N_{RPM} \cdot \sqrt{Q_{gpm}}}{NPSH_{R,ft}^{0.75}} = {2733.00}\cdot\omega_{ss} = 8146.8 \frac{\sqrt{\phi(1-\nu^2)}}{\tau^{0.75}}$

$\phi = \frac{V_{axial}}{U_{tip}} = \frac{Q}{A U_{tip}} = \frac{Q}{\pi (r_{tip}^2-r_{hub}^2) \omega r_{tip} } =\frac{Q}{\pi \omega r_{tip}^3 (1-\nu ^2)}$

- $NPSH_R$ = net positive suction head, required (at inducer inlet)
- $Q$ = volumetric flowrate
- $N$ = shaft speed
- $\nu$ = hub to tip ratio. Typical values range around 0.2 - 0.4 for a cantilevered inducer, or 0.5-0.6 otherwise.

$N_{ss}$ is the imperial version, common in US literature. $\omega_{ss}$ is the dimensionless version, but is not yet commonly seen in pump literature. Development of an inducer design typically starts with defining the target N_{ss}. A higher value reduces the NPSH_{R}, which reduces the required tank pressures. The consequence of increasing N_{ss} is that it requires a smaller flow coefficient (because of the Brumfield criterion); which necessitates either a reduction in flowrate (engine thrust), an overall larger/heavier inducer, and/or a faster shaft speed.

=== Brumfield criterion ===
There is a direct tradeoff between suction performance (described by the cavitation parameter $\tau$) and flow coefficient as described by the Brumfield criterion:

$\tau = \frac{NPSH_{R}}{U_{tip}^2 / 2g} = \frac{3 \phi_{opt}^2}{1-2\phi_{opt}^2}$

== Use in rocketry ==
In order to achieve high delta-v, the structural mass of a launch vehicle should be as low as possible. Liquid fuel tanks can be constructed lighter if the pressure within those tanks is kept low. Typically, for pump-fed rocket engines, the propellant tank pressures (and masses) are 1/10 to 1/40 of those in a pressure-fed rocket. The structural weight constraint also makes the rotating speed of the turbopump rotor as high as possible. For example, the rotating speed of the oxygen turbopump of the Japanese LE-7 rocket engine is 18300rpm. These two factors above combine to make the pump impeller very susceptible to cavitation. If cavitation occurs in the impeller, the performance of the pump will be severely degraded and the pump itself may be damaged.

=== Industry examples ===
	X-8; LOX; high flow	X-8; LOX; low flow	S-3D; LOX	J-2; LOX	J-2; LH2; high flow	J-2; LH2; low flow	RS-25; LOX
Blade count	2	3 (shrouded)	4	3	4, +4 splitters	4, +4 splitters	4 (LPOTP), 12 (HPOTP)
Flow coefficient $\phi$	0.106	0.05	0.116	0.109	0.094	0.074	0.076
Head coefficient $\psi$	0.10	0.063	0.075	0.11	0.21	0.20	0.366
Hub-tip ratio $\nu$	0.23	0.19	0.31	0.20	0.42	0.38	0.29
Suction specific speed $\omega_{ss}$ / $N_{ss}$	11.4 / 31200	21.2 / 58000	10.4 / 28500	12.5 / 34300	15.8 / 43200	16.2 / 44200	
