= Fallen Angels (Niven, Pournelle, and Flynn novel) =

1991 science fiction novel by Larry Niven, Jerry Pournelle, and Michael Flynn

- Author: Larry Niven, Jerry Pournelle, and Michael Flynn
- Cover artist: Stephen Hickman
- Language: English
- Genre: Dystopian science fiction
- Publisher: Baen
- Publication date: 1991
- Publication place: United States
- Media type: Print and eBook
- ISBN: 0-7434-3582-6
- OCLC: 50129308
- Dewey Decimal: 813/.54 21
- LC Class: PS3564.I9 F35 1991

Fallen Angels (1991) is a science fiction novel by three American science fiction authors, Larry Niven, Jerry Pournelle, and Michael Flynn, and published by Jim Baen. Winner of 1992 Prometheus Award, the novel was written as a tribute to the science fiction fandom and includes many of its well-known figures, legends, and practices. It champions modern technology and ridicules its critics, including, budget cutting politicians, fringe environmentalists, and the forces of ignorance.

The novel takes aim at several targets of ridicule: Senator William Proxmire, radical environmentalists and mystics, such as a character who believes that one cannot freeze to death in the snow because ice is a crystal and "crystals are healing." It also mocks ignorance in journalism (for example, one "expert" cited in a news article believes that the astronauts must have superhuman strength, based on a photograph of a weightless astronaut easily handling heavy construction equipment) and the non-scientific world in general. Several real people are tuckerized into the book in a more positive light, including many fans who made donations to charity for that express purpose and a character called "RMS" (presumably Richard M. Stallman) who leads a network of hackers called the Legion of Doom, connected by a series of BBS systems.

== Setting ==
The novel is set in an unspecified "near-future" (one of the main characters has childhood memories of the Exxon Valdez disaster) in which a radical left-wing environmentalist movement has joined forces with the religious right through a shared distaste for modern technology. The resulting bipartisan conspiracy has gained control of the US government and imposed draconian luddite laws which, in attempts to curb global warming, have ironically brought about the greatest environmental catastrophe in recorded history: an ice age which may eventually escalate into a Snowball Earth.

The exact process is described: clouds are water condensation, and so cannot form without cloud condensation nuclei in the atmosphere. The emission laws have removed most of this, reducing cloud cover, meaning the ground loses heat faster. This in combination with the drop in greenhouse gases has resulted in the return and exacerbation of the Little Ice Age, which has become self-perpetuating as glaciers have a much higher albedo than other surfaces.

As a radical totalitarian environmentalist party now controls the US government, the scientific explanation is denounced as "propaganda from life-hating technophiles", and blame for the ice age is instead solely placed on the society surviving in orbit. Science fiction fandom forms the core of a pro-technology underground in the United States, working in tandem with hacker movements. Other technologists – accused by the government of pursuing "materialist science" – were removed from their jobs and forced underground, where they were generally unable to continue their work. This rabid distaste for technology has resulted in the collapse of the economy, and lack of education and a complicit media has left the majority of the population credulous and easily manipulated. The Greens have been in power for most of the lives of the characters.

As glaciers rapidly advance south, Canada and the northern United States are all but destroyed. Near the edge of the glaciers, in Milwaukee, barbaric feudal systems arise as the federal government and markets collapse, leaving violence and disease in their wake. In orbit, Mir and Space Station Freedom survive in tandem with a Lunar colony, but with no support from Earth. The city of Winnipeg is the last major outpost of Canadian civilization, warmed and inhabitable due to immense amounts of solar power beamed from the space stations.

== Plot summary ==
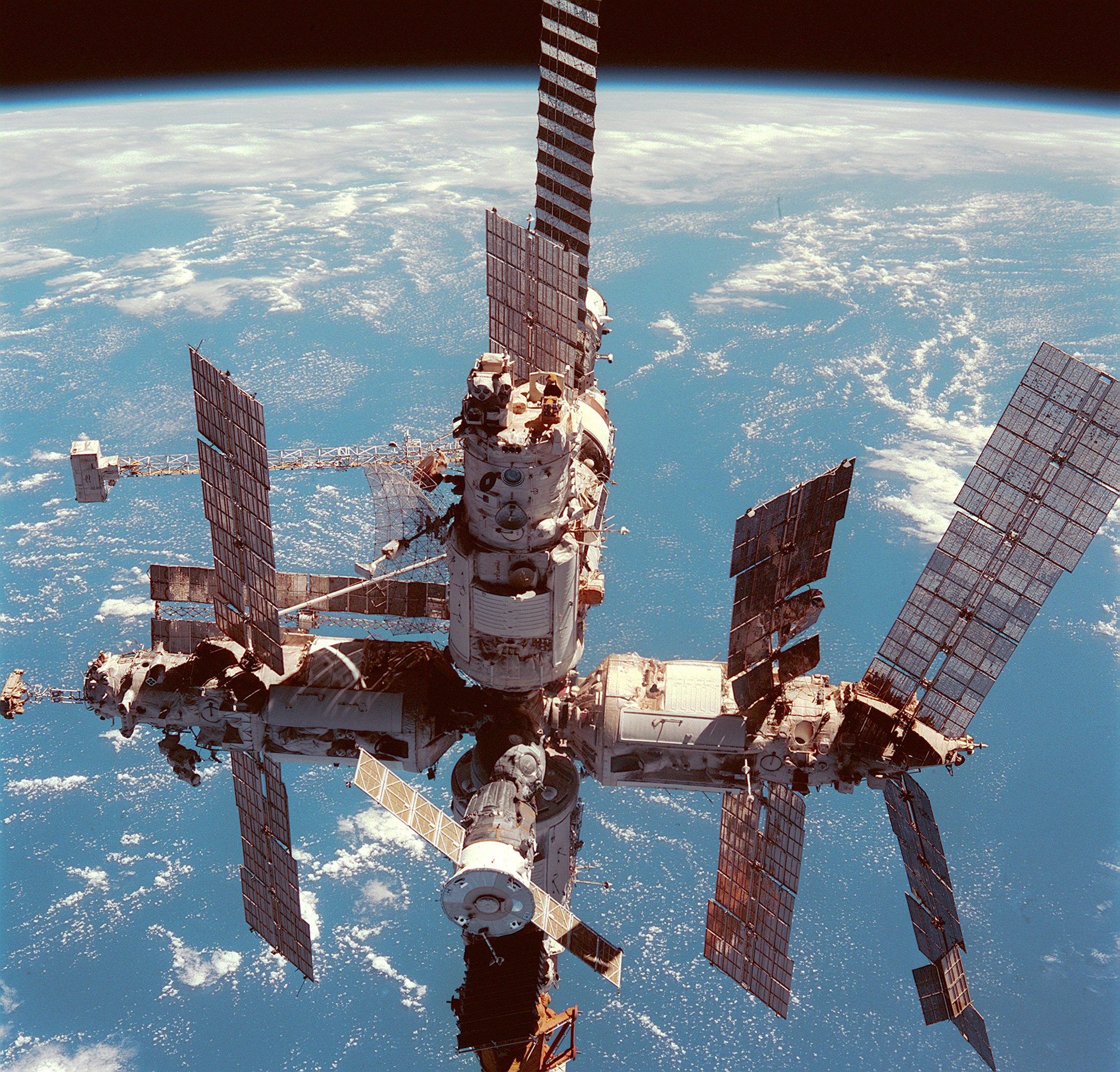
Space station Mir, home to Russo-American Gordon Tanner

Astronauts from the orbital society fly a modified scramjet, redesigned to harvest nitrogen from the Earth's atmosphere. Government policy declares that these ships are responsible for the ice age, so the scramjet is shot down with a surface-to-air missile. The pilot and copilot, an Earth-born American named Alex MacLeod and a space-born Russo-American named Gordon Tanner, are forced to crash land in Canada atop the glaciers.

Upon hearing of this, the fan underground embarks on a rescue mission – a group of fans rides north through the Dakotas to rescue the astronauts before they can be apprehended by the Government. Upon reaching the Dakotas, the fans must travel largely on foot, as their van is unable to traverse the glaciers. However, they have a major advantage over their foes in the government – their relationship with the space station provides them with superior navigational abilities; following the fall of scientific society, the United States Air Force (USAF) no longer enjoys access to satellite reconnaissance. The fans are able to reach the downed spacecraft well in advance of the USAF.

Their escape is aided in a similar manner. Though the Angels are unable to walk due to their overexposure to weightlessness and must be dragged along on sleds, the microwave power transmission beam reserved for Winnipeg is diverted to warm the travellers as they return south to their van. In addition, a tribe of nomadic Inuit peoples shares supplies with them in thanks for the warmth provided by the microwave beam.

Upon finally reaching their van, the rescuers flee to a small science fiction convention of some 50 fans at a mansion owned by one of their own. Once there, one of the fans takes on the role of personal trainer to help the Angels adjust to Earth's gravity including various asanas from yoga. At the con, the fans brainstorm a daring plan - before the Greens had come to power, one of the Board of Trustees for the Metropolitan Museum of Boston by the name of Ron Cole supposedly refurbished a Titan II rocket. This rocket still exists at the Museum of Science and Industry at Chicago. The fans and the Angels leave for Chicago just moments before the mansion is raided by the Green police.

The trip to Chicago gives the reader a brutal depiction of American life without basic technology. A blizzard forces the fans to take shelter in a farm town - where at least one towns-person dies in each blizzard for lack of heating oil. After hitching a ride in a consignment of cheese, the fans are captured by the feudal inhabitants of Milwaukee who are burning the excess houses in the city for heat. One of their captors has the food swapped with moonshine liquor and forces the group into slavery to pay off a series of trumped-up "fines". They are assisted by a fellow fan amongst their captors, and are able to continue on to Chicago.

When the fans finally meet Ron Cole, their hopes are crushed. The rocket is a decaying wreck, and Cole is a shadow of his former self due to invasive "reeducation" treatments. However, Cole is able to put them on another path – a privately constructed single-stage-to-orbit spacecraft at Edwards Air Force Base, disguised by the simple and effective method of its designer, Gary Hudson, declaring it non-functional.

== See also ==
- Climate change in popular culture
