= Preload (engineering) =

Internal application of stress to mechanical systems

Preload is an engineering term with several meanings. In the general sense, it refers to the internal application of stress to certain mechanical systems.

== Fastener preload ==
The most common usage is to describe the load applied to a fastener as a result of its being installed, i.e., before any external loads are applied (e.g., tightening the nut on a bolt). Preload in such cases is important for several reasons.

First, a tightened bolt experiences only a small fraction of any external load that will be applied later, so that a fully tightened bolt can (depending on the exact application) sustain a much greater load than a loosely tightened bolt.

Second, a nut that is correctly tightened will resist becoming loose under the influence of vibration, temperature cycling, etc.

== Bearing preload ==
Application of bearing preload in a wheel assembly of an inline skate

Internal stress to a bearing through application of negative clearance is known as bearing preloading. Advantages of preloading include the following: maintain axial and radial position for accurate displacements of angular movements; increase bearing rigidity; prevent sliding or gyroscope-like movements, especially with high acceleration or rotation rates; maintain relative position of bearing elements. Preloading methods include position preload and constant pressure preload.

== Testing preload ==
It is also used in testing a specimen, for a process where the crosshead moves to load the specimen to a specified value before a test starts. Data is not captured during the preload segment.

When tensile specimens are initially placed into testing grips, they can be subjected to small compressive forces. These forces can cause specimens to bend imperceptibly, causing inaccurate and inconsistent results. Establishing a small preload as a part of the test method eliminates those compressive forces on specimens and improves the repeatability of results.

== Soil preloading ==
In civil engineering, soil preloading refers to the process of applying a compressive load to a soil or rock layer to consolidate it before starting construction. The applied vertical stress is necessary to deter uneven settlement due to the weight of structures built upon the soil.

== Applications ==
Preload becomes very important for large mechanical and high performance systems such as large telescopes. In the general sense, it refers to the internal application of stress to certain mechanical systems. By tensioning, preloading increases the natural frequency of a structure, avoiding resonance due to external disturbances. It also prevents buckling if stresses change depending on position in certain systems. In the particular case for bearings and fasteners, preload reduces or cancels backlash or dead zones. In addition, preload aids to limit applied loads to a system.

== See also ==
- Bolted joint
