= LunaCorp =

American moon rover company

LunaCorp was a company headed by David Gump, and established in 1989 and based in Arlington, Virginia. It was designed around a privately funded mission, using Russian technology, to put a rover on the Moon. The goal of the company was to fund the mission by the entertainment value of having customers drive the rover. The program's advisor was Dr. Buzz Aldrin.

In 1995, the company intended to have two rovers on the moon by 1998. The rovers were never launched. The company received funding from Radio Shack in 2000 to build a rover to search for ice at the moon's poles. It was expected that the commercial lunar rover would bring in revenue by selling science data and entertainment. Gump also proposed sending back live visuals and movement data that could be translated into an amusement park ride. He hoped to recoup one-third of the rovers' cost by selling the ability to control its rovers to theme parks and science museums.

After producing no tangible results the company was dissolved in 2003.

The details of the mission evolved with time. Because the Moon is hotter than boiling water at noon and colder than liquid nitrogen at night, in the final version of the design the robot would avoid those extremes by circumnavigating the Moon every 29.5 days (the length of a lunar day) to stay in sunlight, a strategy originally proposed by Geoffrey Landis. "Our robot, by driving completely around the Moon at a high latitude at only a few kilometers per hour, will enjoy lunar morning temperatures all the time by staying in sync with the sun", said the mission's controller.
