= Michael Potter (entrepreneur) =

Entrepreneur

Michael Potter is an entrepreneur, documentary filmmaker, author, and social enterprise investor.

== Education ==
Potter graduated with a BA in government from the California State University, Sacramento and a minor in Business Administration. He received a Master's of Science from the London School of Economics, and a certificate in Space Studies from the International Space University (ISU SSP'88).

== Business activities ==
Potter runs a family investment firm, Paradigm Ventures, which focuses on new strategies for analyzing and developing high-technology ventures. One of the companies they have invested in is Global Connect. Michael Potter is also the current vice chairman of Manna Energy Foundation and is the Founder of the NGO, Geeks without Frontiers. These two foundations focuses on the eradication of poverty through the use of social entrepreneurship. Manna currently has projects in Rwanda and Kenya involving the installation of biogas generators, high-efficiency wood stoves and solar-powered water-purification systems. Geeks without Frontiers is currently developing an open source, Wi-Fi network bringing Internet access to undeveloped areas of Africa and developing the concept of Dig Once. Michael Potter is currently a Senior Fellow at the International Institute of Space Commerce, an institute dedicated to the study and promotion of space industry

== Filmmaker ==
Potter produced the documentary film "Do You Dream in Color," which premiered in 2014 at The Big Sky Documentary Film Festival in Missoula, Montana. The documentary is the coming-of-age story of four courageous blind high school students as they strive to prove that their disability will not hold them back from achieving their dreams. Potter also produced and directed the award-winning documentary film Orphans of Apollo, which premiered in 2008 at the New Space Conference in Crystal City, Virginia. The documentary is based on a group of entrepreneurs heading MirCorp, who negotiate a business deal with the Russian government to lease the Mir space station for commercial space station. Potter's film was the winner of the Space Frontier Foundation's Vision of the Future 2008. Potter previously worked on the thirteen part WGBN Series, War and Peace in the Nuclear Age. He currently has two other documentaries in production, The university about the founding of Singularity University, and Immortality of Bust, about the Transhuman Candidate for President in 2016.

== Author ==
Potter wrote a chapter of the "Handbook of Cosmic Hazards & Planetary Defense," edited by Dr. Joe Pelton & William Ailor, Aerospace Corporation, James Green, NASA, Michael Marov, of the Russian Academy of Science, and Tommaso Sgobba, executive director of the International Association for the Advancement of Space Safety, Spring Press 2015 (to be published). His essay, included as a chapter in this handbook, is called "The Greatest Planetary Defense Gap: Operation & Execution," and was published in 2014. His entire essay can be found at: . He also wrote a White Paper entitled "Innovative Models for Private Financing of Space Science Mission," which argues that the issue of space financing is not only an area primed for significant growth but also one of extreme and continuing importance to humanity. This entire White Paper can be found at: . Potter also recently published a White Paper entitled "Vision to Bring BroadBand to the Next Billion" on iTunes Books, which discusses a clear road map that will contribute to the overall aim of bringing broadband to three billion people by the year 2020—the ‘Communications Singularity.’ However, it is also focused on helping to bring the additional billion people on to the internet who are mostly based in rural and village areas in developing countries. The entire White Paper can be found here: . He co-authored a chapter in the book, "International Cooperation for the Development of Space" (Volume I). The chapter he co-authored is Chapter 2012, entitled, "The 100 Year Starship Endeavor." He co-authored this chapter alongside Jeffrey Nosanov. In addition, he co-authored a chapter of "International Lunar Initiative Organization," which was published in 1992 in Cambridge, Massachusetts. He co-authored Chapter 3, entitled "Organization, Policy, and Law.". He also wrote "The Real Intellectual Origins of Smaller, Faster, Cheaper: An Underground Student Movement," printed in San Francisco in 1995. Potter was given an acknowledgment page in the 1991 science fiction novel, "Lunar Descent" by Allen Steele. He was also a contributor to "The Nuclear Age Reader," edited by Jeffrey Porro, and published in New York in 1989 by Alfred A. Knopf Inc.

== Published articles ==
In his article, “Human Rights in the Space Age: An International and Legal Political Analysis,” Potter focuses on space and human rights issues that have collided in the areas of satellite broadcasting and receiving, remote sensing, and technology transfer. He explores the possibilities of how "space age" technologies and the exploration of the final frontier could transform the way we think about human rights. In the article, “Swords into Ploughshares: Missiles as Commercial Launchers”, Potter discusses the legal and policy implications of a commercial launch vehicle based on the SS-20 missile after the signing of an INF arms control treaty in 1987 resulted in a surplus of missiles. Potter has published many articles in, “Colloquium on the Law of Outer Space” focusing on international law and space, such as: “The Outer Space Cyberspace Nexus - Satellite Crimes”; “European Regulation of Competitive Satellite Services - Battling the Cartel and the Monopolies”; and “International Satellite Organizations- from Monopoly to Cartel.”.

== High-tech industry ==
Potter worked as an international telecommunications analyst at the Center for Strategic and International Studies (CSIS) in Washington D.C. Michael Potter was one of the founders of Esprit Telecom, a European telecommunications company, where he was president until leaving to establish Paradigm Ventures. At Esprit Telecom Potter had 1,000 employees in over nine European countries and a market capitalization of a billion US dollars. Potter also was a founding member of the European Competitive Telecommunications Association, an organization which lobbied for deregulation of telecommunications markets across Europe. Potter has written a number of articles about high technology, business, and policy.

== Lunar X Prize ==
Potter is a director of the company Odyssey Moon, which is the first company to register to compete for the Google Lunar X Prize.
