= Volute (pump) =

Curved funnel that increases in area as it approaches the discharge port

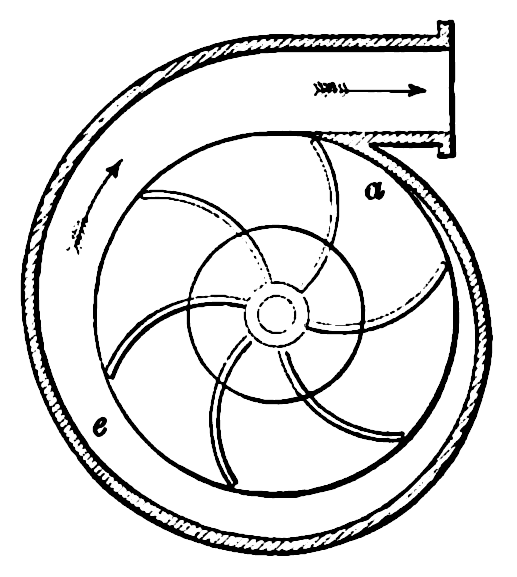
Pump and volute casing

A volute is a curved funnel that increases in area as it approaches the discharge port. The volute of a centrifugal pump is the casing that receives the fluid being pumped by the impeller, maintaining the velocity of the fluid through to the diffuser. As liquid exits the impeller it has high kinetic energy and the volute directs this flow through to the discharge. As the fluid travels along the volute it is joined by more and more fluid exiting the impeller but, as the cross sectional area of the volute increases, the velocity is maintained if the pump is running close to the design point. If the pump has a low flow rate then the velocity will decrease across the volute leading to a pressure rise causing a cross thrust across the impeller that we see as vibration. If the pump flow is higher than design the velocity will increase across the volute and the pressure will decrease according to Bernoulli's Principle. This will cause a side thrust in the opposite direction to that caused by low flow but the result is the same – vibration with resultant short bearing and seal life.

The volute does not convert kinetic energy into pressure – that is done at the diffuser by reducing liquid velocity while increasing pressure.

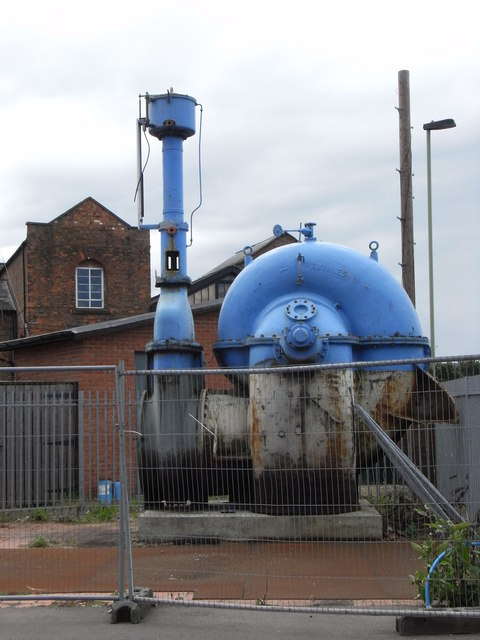
Large water pump from the floating docks at Gloucester

The name "volute" is inspired by the resemblance of this kind of casing to the scroll-like part near the top of an ionic order column in classical architecture, called a volute.

== Split volute ==
In a split volute or double volute pump, the path along the volute is partitioned, providing two distinct discharge paths. The streams start out 180 degrees from each other, and merge by the time they reach the discharge port. This arrangement helps to balance the radial force on the bearings.

== See also ==
- Roots blower
