= Space Frontier Foundation =

American space advocacy nonprofit corporation

- Founded: 1988
- Founders: Rick Tumlinson; Bob Werb; James A. M. Muncy
- Type: Space advocacy, 501(c)3, Education
- Region served: Worldwide
- Method: Advocate driven projects enabling the growth of the NewSpace community
- Website: spacefrontier.org

The Space Frontier Foundation is an American space advocacy nonprofit corporation organized to promote the interests of increased involvement of the private sector, in collaboration with government, in the exploration and development of space. Its advocate members design and lead a collection of projects with goals that align to the organization's goals as described by its credo.

The Space Frontier Foundation is an organization of people dedicated to opening the Space Frontier to human settlement as rapidly as possible.

Our goals include protecting the Earth’s fragile biosphere and creating a freer and more prosperous life for each generation by using the unlimited energy and material resources of space.

Our purpose is to unleash the power of free enterprise and lead a united humanity permanently into the Solar System.

== History ==
The foundation was founded in 1988 by space activists led by Rick Tumlinson, Bob Werb and Jim Muncy who felt that: "it was technically possible to realize their shared vision of large-scale...settlement of the inner solar system... [but] they knew this was not happening (and couldn't happen) under the status-quo centrally planned and exclusive U.S. government space program."

Since 2005 the foundation has relied heavily on NASA funding, including a recent $110,000 award for business competition. Thomas Olson appeared on The Space Show to promote the competition. The competition takes place during the foundation's New-Space 12 conference, which is sponsored by NASA.

The foundation supported the George W. Bush Administration's Vision for Space Exploration. In March, 2005, the foundation praised the selection of Dr. Michael Griffin as the next administrator of NASA. A press release said "Mike Griffin will be a good captain for NASA." Bob Werb, the foundation chairman, said "Mike Griffin knows more about space and capitalism than the last three administrators combined. Vision-killing bureaucrats inside and outside of government should be trembling in their boots." Richard Tumlinson said, "This bodes well for the emerging New Space industry."

== Activities and policies ==
In recent years, the Space Frontier Foundation has been supportive of various private sector efforts such as the Ansari X Prize, the SpaceShipOne project, and entrepreneur Robert Bigelow's plans to build a space hotel. The foundation has been critical of the U.S. government's efforts in space, particularly those of the National Aeronautics and Space Administration. For example, the foundation has criticized NASA's Space Shuttle and Ares I, claiming that the shuttle's work could be better done by private sector companies. However, the foundation has supported some recent NASA efforts, such as NASA's Centennial Challenges prize program for stimulating private-sector innovation and the new NASA direction of cancelling Constellation in favour of technology development and supporting commercial companies.

The foundation's current strategic focus is to enable the growth of the NewSpace community. The foundation's board of directors has endorsed the following objectives:

- The Space Frontier Foundation's mission is to open the space frontier to permanent human settlement;
- An open frontier can only be achieved by unleashing the power of free enterprise;
- Government's role in unleashing the power of free enterprise is critical and best accomplished by adopting the proven frontier paradigm of catalyzing the private sector;
- All parts of all governments must embrace and fully utilize the potential of the emerging NewSpace Industry, and;
- Regarding NASA, the near-term focus of the foundation is on maximizing the market share of goods and services that the NewSpace industry is permitted to capture.

Advocate & Membership Coordination
Coordinators
- Advocates: Sara Jennings
- Regional - Canada: Eva-Jane Lark
- Regional - Asia: Misuzu Onuki

Website Management
- Brian Young

=== Affiliations ===
The foundation is a founding executive member of the Alliance for Space Development.

=== Membership ===
The foundation's membership is composed of volunteers who typically fall into one of two groups. The regular members are those who provide a large amount of the volunteer work necessary to operate the projects that support the conferences and many other less obvious processes associated with a corporate office. Regular members donate time and money as they can in accordance with other demands upon them. Advocate members are those who are invited to step to the next level and help run the projects, start new ones, and fund the foundation's activities. Advocates are those who have demonstrated a high degree of understanding and commitment to the foundation's goals along with a track record of action toward these goals. Advocates are asked to donate more time and money on a regular basis and are the voting members that decide elections for the foundation's board of directors.

Project managers
- NewSpace Business Plan Competition: Thomas A Olson
- NewSpace Conference: Hannah Kerner
- Teachers in Space: Elizabeth Kennick
- Political Action & Strategy: Aaron Oesterle
- NewSpace News: Curtis Iwata

=== Projects ===
Projects are the primary means by which the foundation acts in support of its goals. Projects are advocate managed activities with their own objectives, budgets, and volunteer support teams. Each project pursues what its members think they can accomplish using the skills they have. Advocates working each project assume the responsibility for keeping them aligned with Foundation objectives as best they can. This mostly decentralized approach to action is intentional and a core tradition of the foundation.

Past projects include The Watch, an asteroid and comet detection and research project, Permission to Dream, connecting students around the world through the wonder of space and astronomy, sponsorship of conferences, and the Space Settlement Project in marketing space to the general public. Current projects include Teachers in Space, a program to offer American teachers rides on future sub-orbital spaceflight launches.

Furthermore, the foundation hosts its annual NewSpace conference every year in July, which enables NewSpace leaders to meet and collaborate regarding the future of the movement.

== See also ==
- NewSpace
- Privatization
- Space settlement
