= SpaceX Starship =

Reusable superheavy-lift general-purpose launch vehicle under development

Starship
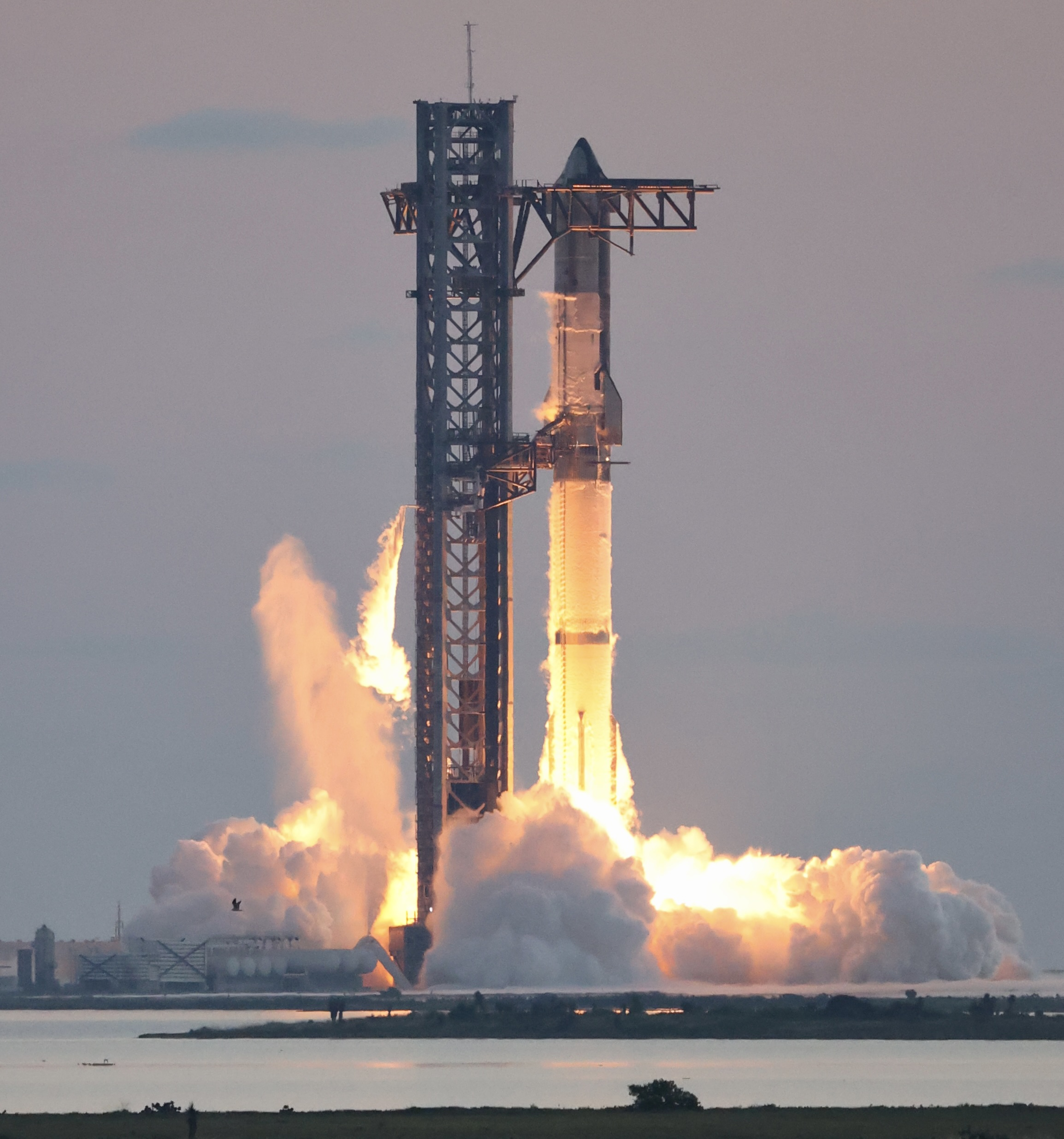
- Starship ignition during launch on its fifth flight test
- Function: Super heavy-lift launch vehicle
- Manufacturer: SpaceX
- Country of origin: United States
- Project cost: More than US$15 billion
- Cost per launch: $100 million (expendable)

Size
- Height: Block 1: 121.3 m (398 ft); Block 2: 123.1 m (404 ft); Block 3: 124.4 m (408 ft); Block 4: 142 m (466 ft) (est.)
- Diameter: 9 m (30 ft)
- Mass: 5,000 t (11,000,000 lb)
- Stages: 2

Capacity

Payload to LEO
- Mass: Block 1: 15 t (33,000 lb); Block 2: 35 t (77,000 lb); Block 3: 100 t (220,000 lb); Block 4: 200 t (440,000 lb) (est.)
- Volume: 614 m^{3} (21,700 cu ft)

Associated rockets
- Comparable: Energia; Long March 9; N1; Saturn V; Space Launch System

Launch history
- Status: Active
- Launch sites: Starbase, OLP-2 & OLP-1 (under reconstruction); Cape Canaveral, SLC-37A & SLC-37B (under construction); Kennedy, LC-39A (under construction); Starbase Louisiana, 12 launch pads (future)
- Total launches: 15: Block 1: 6; Block 2: 5; Block 3: 4
- Success(es): 10: Block 1: 4; Block 2: 2; Block 3: 4
- Failures: 5: Block 1: 2 (IFT-1, IFT-2); Block 2: 3 (IFT-7, IFT-8, IFT-9); Block 3: 0
- First flight: April 20, 2023; 3 years ago
- Last flight: November 13, 2026; 9 days ago
Stage info
First stage – Super Heavy
Height	71 m (233 ft)
Diameter	9 m (30 ft)
Empty mass	275 t (606,000 lb)
Gross mass	3,675 t (8,102,000 lb)
Propellant mass	Block 1: 3,250 t (7,170,000 lb); Block 2: 3,250 t (7,170,000 lb); Block 3: 3,650 t (8,050,000 lb); Block 4: 4,050 t (8,930,000 lb) (planned)
Powered by	33 × Raptor engines
Maximum thrust	80.8 MN (18,200,000 lb_{f})
Specific impulse	SL: 327 s (3.21 km/s)
Propellant	CH_{4} / LOX
Second stage – Starship
Height	Block 1: 50.3 m (165 ft); Block 2: 52.1 m (171 ft)
Diameter	9 m (30 ft)
Propellant mass	Block 1: 1,200 t (2,600,000 lb); Block 2: 1,500 t (3,300,000 lb); Block 3: 1,600 t (3,500,000 lb); Block 4: 2,300 t (5,100,000 lb) (planned)
Powered by	3 × Raptor engines 3 × Raptor vacuum engines
Maximum thrust	15,828 kN (3,558,000 lb_{f})
Specific impulse	SL: 327 s (3.21 km/s) vac: 380 s (3.7 km/s)
Propellant	CH_{4} / LOX

Starship is a two-stage, fully reusable, super heavy-lift launch vehicle being developed and operated by American aerospace company SpaceX. Built and launched from Starbase in Texas, it is intended as the successor to the company's Falcon 9 and Falcon Heavy rockets, and is part of SpaceX's broader reusable launch system development program. If completed as designed, Starship would be the first fully reusable orbital rocket and have the highest payload capacity of any launch vehicle. As of November 13, 2026, Starship has launched 15 times, with 10 successful flights and 5 failures.

The vehicle consists of two stages: the Super Heavy booster and the Starship spacecraft, both powered by Raptor engines burning liquid methane (the main component of natural gas) and liquid oxygen. Both stages are intended to return to the launch site and land vertically at the launch tower for potential reuse. The launch tower first caught a Super Heavy booster on the fifth flight test in October 2024, and first caught a Starship upper stage on Flight 15 in November 2026. Once in space, the Starship upper stage is intended to function as a standalone spacecraft capable of carrying crew and cargo. Missions beyond low Earth orbit would require multiple in-orbit refueling flights. At the end of its mission, Starship reenters the atmosphere using heat shield tiles similar to those of the Space Shuttle. SpaceX states that its goal is to reduce launch costs by reusing and mass-producing both stages.

SpaceX initially expressed ambitions to use Starship for crewed missions to Mars, but the plan was revised to prioritize returning humans to the Moon. SpaceX has also proposed a wide range of missions for Starship, such as deploying large satellites, space station modules, and space telescopes. A crewed variant, the Starship Human Landing System, is being developed under a contract with NASA as part of the Artemis program, with a crewed docking test in low Earth orbit on Artemis III, targeted for mid-2027, and the first crewed landing moved to Artemis IV, targeted for 2028.

SpaceX began developing concepts for a super heavy-lift reusable launch vehicle as early as 2005, though these concepts did not result in active development of Starship until 2018. Development has followed an iterative and incremental approach, involving a high number of prototype vehicles and test flights. Due to several setbacks in development, including the loss of the first four Block 2 upper stages in 2025 (three in flight and one, Ship 36, in a ground-test explosion), Starship did not attempt to reach orbit until its fourteenth flight test, which deployed Starship's first operational payload.

== Description ==
When stacked and fully fueled, Starship has a mass of approximately 5,300 t (11,700,000 lb), (Note: Super Heavy dry mass: 200 t (440,000 lb); Starship dry mass: 100 t (220,000 lb); Super Heavy propellant mass: 3,400 t (7,500,000 lb); Starship propellant mass: 1,500 t (3,300,000 lb). The total of these masses is about 5,300 t (11,700,000 lb).) a diameter of 9 m (30 ft) and a height of 124.4 m (408 ft). The rocket has been designed with the goal of being fully reusable to reduce launch costs; it consists of the Super Heavy booster and the Starship upper stage which are powered by Raptor (RSL) and Raptor Vacuum (RVac) engines.

The bodies of both rocket stages are made from stainless steel and are manufactured by stacking and welding stainless steel cylinders. These cylinders have a height of 1.83 m (6 ft), and a thickness of 3.97 mm (0.156 in).

=== Super Heavy booster ===
Super Heavy was initially 71 m (233 ft) tall (in its Block 1 and Block 2 design, now retired), while Block 3 Super Heavy is 72.3 meters tall. It is 9 m (30 ft) wide, and is composed of four general sections, in ascending order: the engines, the liquid oxygen tank, the liquid methane tank, and the interstage.

=== Tanks ===
The two cryogenic propellant tanks on Super Heavy are separated by a common bulkhead, a similar structural design to the S-II and S-IVB stages on the Saturn V rocket. After Starship's second flight test, the common dome's design was changed to be more elliptical, altering the propellant capacity of both tanks by a small amount. Each tank possesses roughly 74 stringers for structural reinforcement, attached to their interior walls. The booster's two tanks hold a combined 3,650 t (8,050,000 lb) of propellant: 2,860 t (6,310,000 lb) of liquid oxygen and 790 t (1,740,000 lb) of liquid methane. (Note: With a mixture ratio of 3.6 parts oxygen to 1 part methane, 78.3% of 3650 t is 2860 t of liquid oxygen.) Fuel is fed to the engines via a single liquid downcomer, and channeled into distribution manifolds of the engines.

Two quick disconnects are used for loading propellant onto the booster, with one disconnect for liquid oxygen and the other for liquid methane.

=== Propulsion ===
The aft dome of the Super Heavy booster is protected by metallic heat shield tiles. Additional thermal protection is present on some parts of the thrust vector control system. This system uses electric actuators on the thirteen engines in the middle and center rings. Unlike the ascent and boostback burns, which use all thirty-three engines, the landing burn uses only these inner thirteen and draws fuel from dedicated header tanks.

The Raptor engine uses a full-flow staged combustion cycle with oxygen and methane-rich turbopumps. Before 2014, only two full-flow staged-combustion rocket engine designs had advanced enough to undergo testing: the Soviet RD-270 project in the 1960s and the Aerojet Rocketdyne Integrated Powerhead Demonstrator in the mid-2000s. To improve performance, the engines burn subcooled propellant; i.e. the propellants are cooled below their respective boiling points to further increase their density and the engine mass flow rates.

The Block 1 version of the booster (used through November 2024) produced a total of 73.5 MN (16,500,000 lb_{f}), just over twice that of the NASA Saturn V first stage, with this total being expected to increase to 80.8 MN (18,200,000 lb_{f}) for Block 3 boosters and later up to 98.1 MN (22,100,000 lb_{f}) with the planned Block 4 vehicle. The thirty-three engines collectively produce large shock diamonds in the exhaust jet, visible during ascent and descent.

During unpowered flight in the upper atmosphere, control authority is provided by cold gas thrusters fed with residual ullage gas. Four perpendicular vents are located within the interstage. Additional vents are located just below the common dome, pointing toward the engines at a slight angle.

=== Interstage ===
The interstage and forward heat shield of the super heavy booster, which enable hot staging, are directly integrated into the methane tank. During hot staging, Super Heavy shuts down all but five inner engines, and remains attached to Starship until the upper stage ignites its own engines. Also embedded into the methane tank are three electrically actuated grid fins, in a 90/90/180 degree arrangement. Two of these fins have hardpoints, which are used for lifting the vehicle onto the launch mount and for catching the booster when it lands at the launch tower.

Animation of Super Heavy's integration to the launch mount, using mechanical arms

=== Starship spacecraft ===
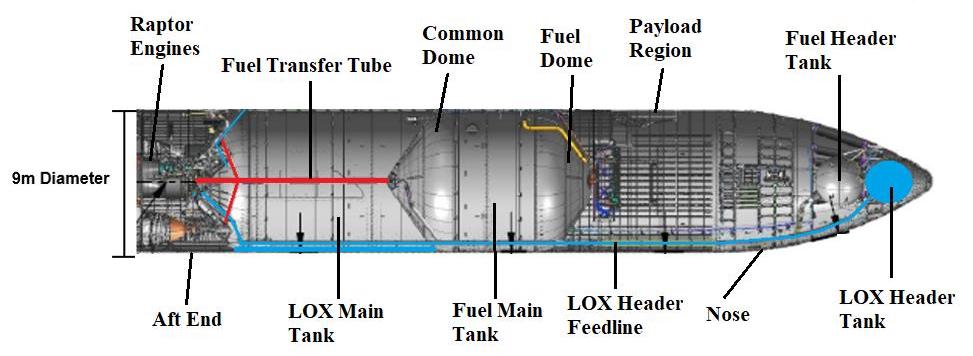
Diagram of a Block 1 Starship's internal structure. Not shown in this diagram are the flaps: the aft flaps are placed at the bottom (or left in this orientation), and the forward flaps are placed at the top (here, right) portion of the vehicle.

The now retired Block 2 version of Starship was 52.1 m (171 ft) tall, 9 m (30 ft) wide, and was composed of four general sections: the engine bay, the oxygen tank, the fuel tank, and the payload bay. The retired Block 1 was constructed in a similar manner, though it was only 50.3 m (165 ft) tall. Elon Musk stated in 2021 that the vehicle had a dry mass of roughly 100 t (220,000 lb). The windward side is protected by a heat shield composed of eighteen thousand hexagonal black tiles that can withstand temperatures of 1,400 °C (2,600 °F). It is designed to protect the vehicle during atmospheric entry and is to be used multiple times with minimal maintenance between flights. The silica-based tiles are attached to Starship with pins, and had small gaps in between to allow for heat expansion. After flight test 4, SpaceX added a secondary ablative layer under the primary heat shield, though this was only added to the flaps of the flight test 6 vehicle. This ablative layer is likely composed of pyron, which is similar in composition to carbon composites. The total mass of the heat shield and ablative layer of a Block 1 ship is 10.5 t (23,000 lb). After flight test 10, SpaceX added a felt, called "crunch wrap," between the gaps in between the tiles to prevent heat seeping in.

=== Tanks ===
The propellant tanks on Starship are separated by a common bulkhead, similar to the ones used on the S-II and S-IVB stages on the Saturn V rocket. While Block 2 vehicles use an elliptical dome, the common and forward domes of the Block 1 design were more conical. Block 1 vehicles only had 24 stringers within the oxygen tank, while Block 2 vehicles had these added to the methane tanks. The vehicle's tanks hold 1,500 t (3,300,000 lb) of propellant, consisting of 1,170 t (2,580,000 lb) of liquid oxygen and 330 t (730,000 lb) of liquid methane. (Note: 78% of 1,500 t (3,300,000 lb) is 1,170 t (2,580,000 lb) of liquid oxygen.)

Fuel is fed to the engines via four downcomers, with three smaller downcomers feeding the Vacuum Raptors/RVacs and the central downcomer feeding the inner three engines. The central downcomer connects to a large sump, instead of directly to the methane tank. The original design had a single downcomer. The liquid oxygen (LOX) downcomer extends into the LOX tank, with a small expanded portion of unknown purpose. Two additional downcomers route methane and oxygen from the header tanks. A camera is located on the walls of the tank, pointed towards the payload bay.

The oxygen tank terminates with the thrust structure of the vehicle. The RVac engines are mounted directly to the aft dome, which has reinforcements mounted inside of the tank. The three sea level engines are mounted on the thrust puck, which forms the bottom of the aft dome. A conical steel structure is mounted inside the bottom of the dome, reinforcing the thrust puck enough to enable its support of the inner three engines. The propellant lines on the vehicles are vacuum jacketed, reducing boiloff while in orbit.

=== Propulsion ===
Starship is powered by six Raptor engines, which are housed within a dedicated shielding compartment. Blocks 1 through 3 have three sea-level engines, as well as three engines optimized for operation in the vacuum of space, called RVacs. Block 4 ships are expected to have three additional RVacs. The sea-level engines are equipped with gimbal actuators, and reignite for the landing burns. After Starship's second flight test, this gimbaling system was switched from a hydraulic system to an electric one, enabling the removal of the hydraulic power units. This change was made to the booster after the first flight test. There are four engine chill lines on board the vehicle, though two of these lines may serve another purpose.

Each engine is protected by a dedicated shielding compartment. Beginning with S25, the Block 1 design had between 14 and 16 such vents. Additional vents were added after flight 7. The fire suppression system, which uses gaseous nitrogen to purge the engine bay during flight, was upgraded after flight 7. A similar system on the booster uses carbon dioxide to purge the individual engine compartments during flight and static fires.

The Raptor engine uses a full-flow staged combustion cycle, which has oxygen and methane-rich turbopumps. Before 2014, only two full-flow staged-combustion rocket engine designs had advanced enough to undergo testing: the Soviet RD-270 project in the 1960s and the Aerojet Rocketdyne Integrated Powerhead Demonstrator in the mid-2000s. To improve performance, the engines burn supercooled propellant.

The Block 1 version of the ship (used through November 2024) produced a total of 12.25 MN (2,750,000 lb_{f}) almost triple the thrust of the Saturn V second stage, with this being expected to increase to 15.69 MN (3,530,000 lb_{f}) for Block 2 boosters and later up to 26.48 MN (5,950,000 lb_{f}) with the Block 3 vehicle.

During unpowered flight in orbit, control authority is provided by cold gas thrusters fed with residual ullage gas. Four such thrusters are located just below the payload bay, and two on the oxygen tank. Near the top of the nosecone, there are two vents connected to the header tanks. Additional vents were added at the base of the vehicle after flight two.

=== Payload bay ===
The payload bay hosts the nosecone, header tanks, forward flaps, multiple COPVs, and the so-called "PEZ dispenser". The header tanks are mounted at the tip of the payload bay. The LOX header tank forms the top of the nosecone, with the methane header tank attached directly below it. These tanks terminate in a conical sump, which are attached to the downcomers. Several COPVs are mounted in the space around the methane header tank, providing the startup gas for the engines, with twelve additional COPVs within the base of the payload bay.

The nosecone has substantial internal reinforcement, mainly around the forward flap attachment points and lifting points for the chopsticks. The number of internal stringers was increased between Block 1 and Block 2 vehicles. Additional reinforcements are used to support the PEZ dispenser on ships equipped with one. Four Starlink antennas are located within the nosecone.

The PEZ dispenser is used to deploy Starlink satellites into LEO. It was first added to S24, though it was permanently sealed until flight 3. It consists of the dispenser mechanism and the door. The door opens by folding into the payload bay.

The dispenser itself is mounted directly to the forward dome. It has a truss structure for its base, with solid steel used elsewhere. A mobile track is used in the base, enabling the dispenser to push the satellite out of the vehicle. After dispensing a satellite, the next payload is lowered onto the base, and is deployed. The opposite occurs during loading, with the dispenser raising its payloads to receive another satellite. In order to prevent the satellite from floating out of the mechanism during zero-g operations, the dispenser locks the satellites in position using a "retention frame". This is lowered alongside the satellites during operation.

=== Flaps ===
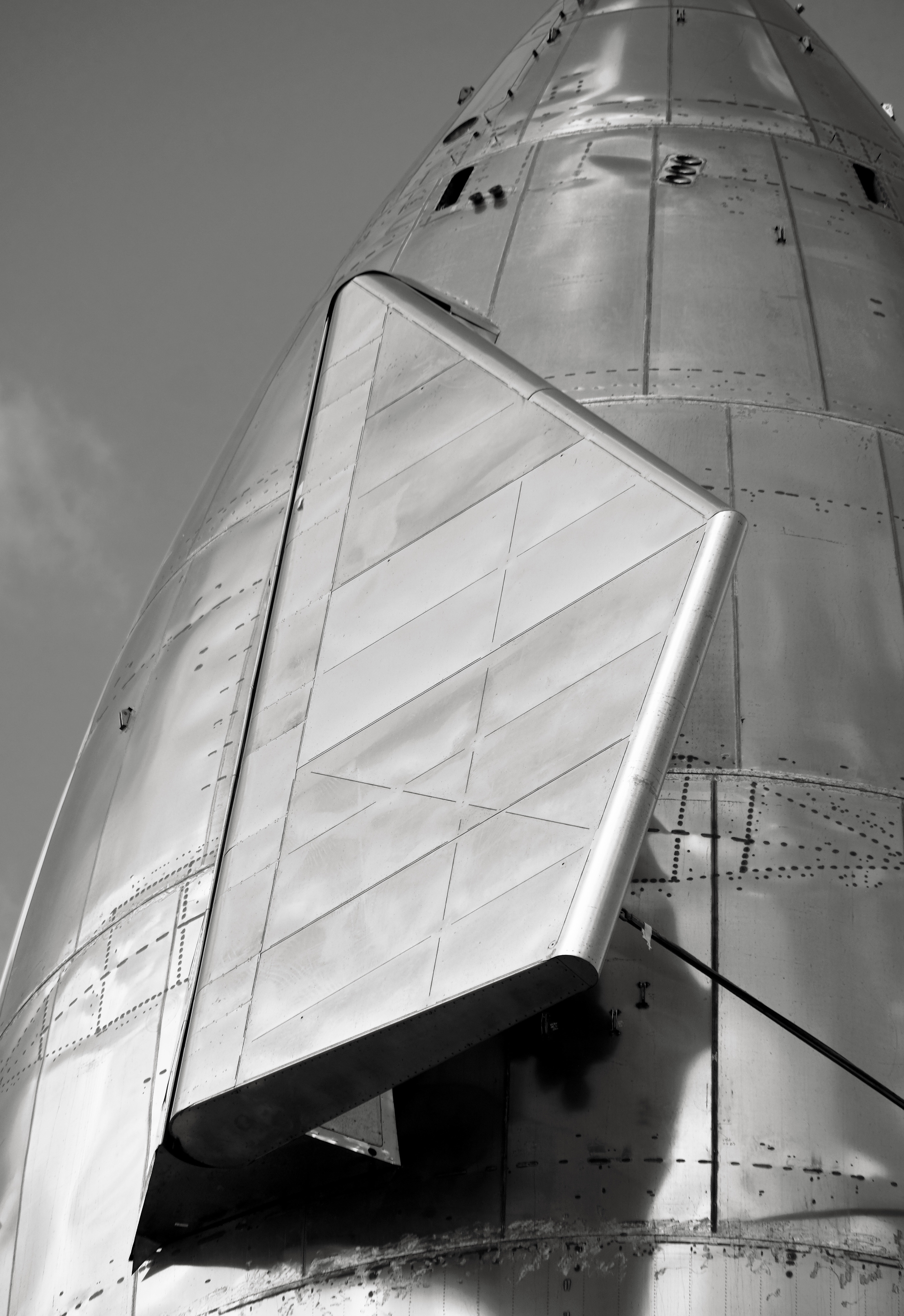
Forward flap on a suborbital Starship prototype

Starship controls its reentry with four flaps, two aft flaps mounted to the sides of the engine bay and LOX tank and two forward flaps on the payload bay. Substantial reinforcements are present in the nosecone for the support of the forward flaps. According to SpaceX, the flaps replace the need for wings or tailplane, reduce the fuel needed for landing, and allow landing at destinations in the Solar System where runways do not exist (for example, Mars). The flap's hinges are sealed in aerocovers because they would otherwise be easily damaged during reentry. Static wicks are present on the flaps, aiding in the discharge of static electricity.

Despite this, damage to the forward flaps was observed on flights four, five, and six, with near complete loss occurring on flight 4. Beginning with Block 2, the design of these forward flaps was significantly changed, moving leeward and becoming thinner and angled. This sets them at an approximately 140-degree angle, compared to the 180-degree angle of the aft flaps and previous version of the forward flaps. This change was made to prevent the static aero from creating a tendency for the Ship to pitch up, even when the forward flaps were stowed, and also reduces the heating on the static aero and forward flaps observed on the last three flights of the Block 1 ship. Both sets of flaps feature cameras in their hinges.

=== Raptor engine ===
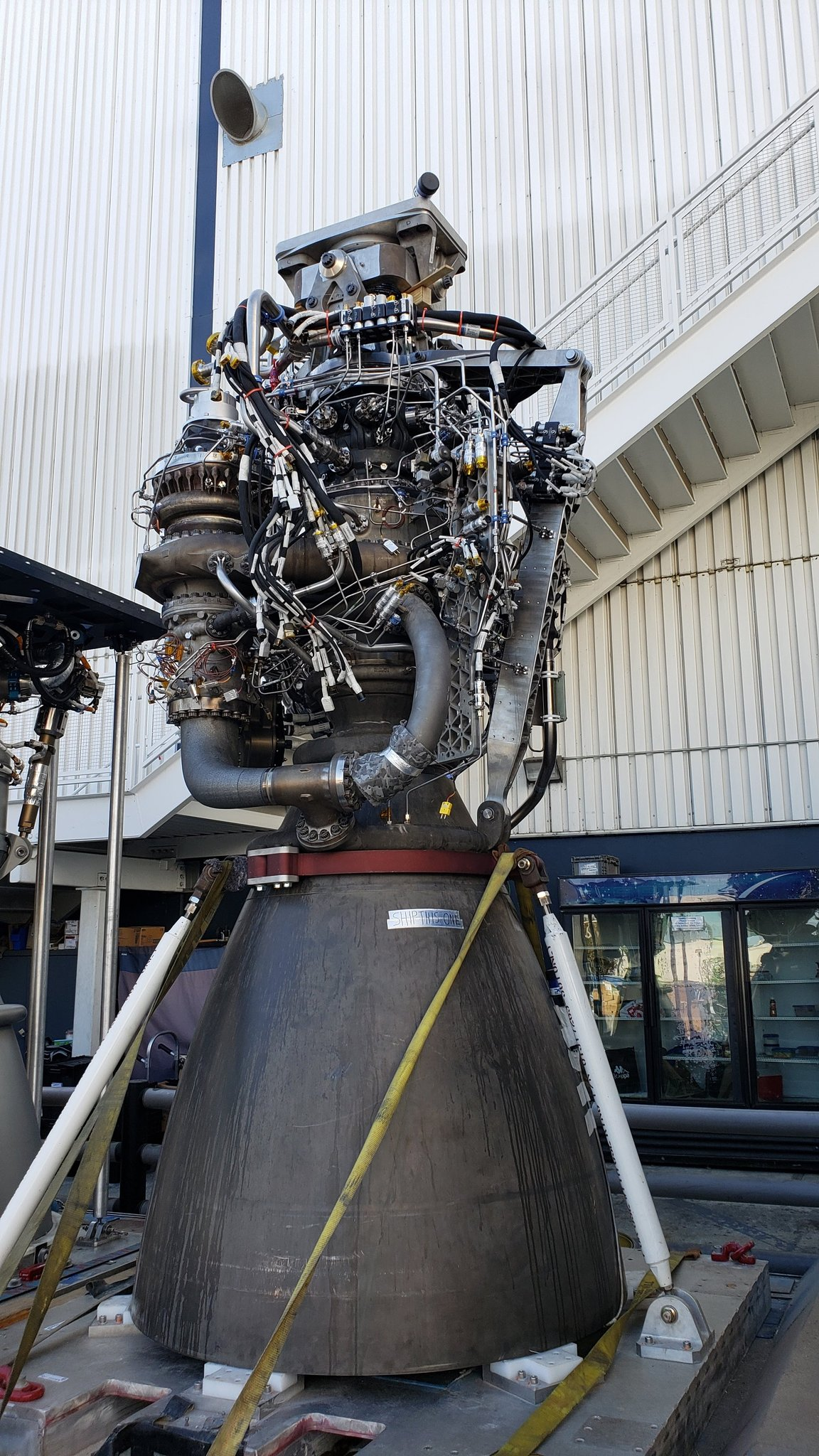
Sea level-optimized Raptor 1 engine, May 2020

Raptor is a family of rocket engines developed by SpaceX for use in Starship and Super Heavy vehicles. It burns liquid oxygen and methane in an efficient and complex full-flow staged combustion power cycle. The Raptor engine uses methane as fuel rather than kerosene because methane gives higher performance and prevents the build-up of deposits in the engine from coking. Methane can also be produced from carbon dioxide and hydrogen using the Sabatier reaction. The engines are designed to be reused many times with little maintenance.

Raptor operates with an oxygen-to-methane mixture ratio of about 3.6:1, lower than the stoichiometric mixture ratio of 4:1 necessary for complete combustion, since operating at higher temperatures would melt the engine. The propellants leave the pre-burners and get injected into the main combustion chamber as hot gases instead of liquid droplets, enabling a higher power density as the propellants mix rapidly via diffusion. The methane and oxygen are at high enough temperatures and pressures that they ignite on contact, eliminating the need for igniters in the main combustion chamber. The engine structure itself is mostly aluminum, copper, and steel; oxidizer-side turbopumps and manifolds subject to corrosive oxygen-rich flames are made of an Inconel-like SX500 superalloy. Some components are 3D printed.

A Raptor 2 engine produces 2.3 MN (520,000 lbf) at a specific impulse of 327 seconds (3.21 km/s) at sea level and 350 seconds (3.4 km/s) in a vacuum. Raptor vacuum, used on the Starship upper stage, is modified with a regeneratively cooled nozzle extension made of brazed steel tubes, increasing its expansion ratio to about 90 and its specific impulse in vacuum to 380 seconds (3.7 km/s). The main combustion chamber operates at a pressure of 350 bar (5,100 psi) exceeding that of any prior operational rocket engine. The Raptor's gimbaling range is 15°, higher than the RS-25's 12.5° and the Merlin's 5°. SpaceX has stated they aim to achieve a per unit production cost of US$250,000 upon starting mass production.

== Versions ==
Performance metrics
Block	1	2	3	4
Payload to orbit (t)	15	35	100	200
Booster propellant (t)	3,250		3,650	4,050
Ship propellant (t)	1,200	1,500	1,600	2,300
Booster liftoff thrust (tf)	7,500		8,240	10,000
Ship initial thrust (tf)	1,250	1,400	1,600	2,700
Ship sea-level engines	3			
Ship vacuum engines	3			6
Booster height (m)	71		72.3	81
Ship height (m)	50.3	52.1		61
Total height (m)	121.3	123.3	124.4	142

On April 4, 2024, Elon Musk provided an update on Starship at Starbase, where two new versions of Starship were announced, Block 2 and Block 3, intended to address the shortcomings of the pre-production prototypes.

=== Block 1 ===
Block 1 was used after 2020–2021 flight tests, beginning with flight test 1 at the start of 2023, to flight tests 5 and 6, then retired.

=== Block 2 ===
Block 2 for both stages was used beginning with flight test 7 at the start of 2025. Block 2 upper stage vehicles featured a thinner forward flap design, flaps that are positioned more leeward, a 25% increase in propellant capacity, redesigned avionics. The integrated vehicle is 3.1 m (10 ft) taller than the previous Block 1 vehicle. Block 2 was retired without attempting an orbital flight. Additionally, Block 2 vehicles were planned to use Raptor 3 engines, removing the need for secondary engine shielding. The Block 2 ship and booster first flew on flight test 7. After flight test 11, Block 2 was retired.

=== Block 3 ===
Block 3 ships have Raptor 3 engines, as well as hardware for refueling operations in LEO, such as docking ports and a redesigned quick disconnect. The switch to Raptor 3 also enables the removal of most of the aft section's shielding.

Block 3 boosters have an integrated vented interstage/forward dome, three grid fins instead of the prior four, and use the grid fins as tower catch points, eliminating the need for separate catch point structure. Like with the ship, the Block 3 boosters use Raptor 3 engines, allowing for the removal of the majority of the booster's engine shielding, reducing weight by over a ton per engine. Block 3 (also called V3) first flew on flight test 12 on May 22, 2026, which was also the first flight of Raptor 3 engines and the first launch from Starbase's second pad.

=== Block 4 ===
Block 4 Ships are expected to feature up to 9 Raptor V4 engines, 6 vacuum engines, up from 3, and 3 sea-level engines. Ship's total propellant capacity is expected to grow from around 1600 tons to around 2500, as Musk said in a post after Flight 15's catch that Ship would grow to around 70 meters (230 ft) and carry 60% more fuel.

Booster V4 is expected to grow to around 81 meters (266 ft) and produce around 98.1 meganewtons (22,100,000 lb_{f}) of thrust at liftoff. There has been some discussion that SpaceX may use a 500-tonne-force (4.9 MN) Raptor V4 in the outer ring, while keeping the 300-tonne-force (2.9 MN) Raptor V4 in the center.

== Planned launch and landing profile ==
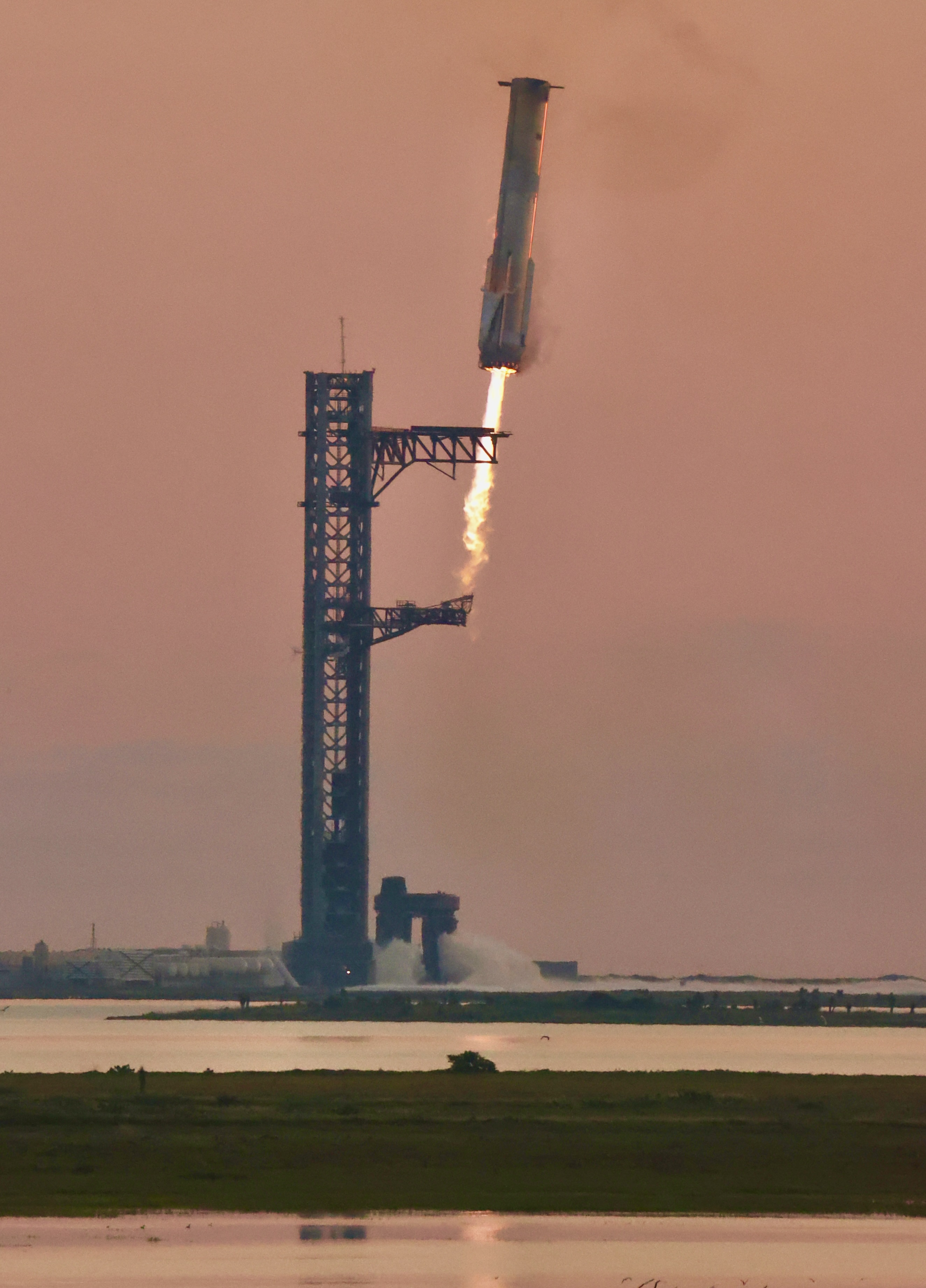
Super Heavy Booster 12 approaching the tower during Starship flight test 5 on October 13, 2024

Payloads will be integrated into Starship at a separate facility and then rolled out to the launch site. Super Heavy and Starship are then to be stacked onto their launch mount and loaded with fuel via the ship quick disconnect (SQD) arm and booster quick disconnect (BQD). The SQD and BQD retract, all 33 engines of Super Heavy ignite, and the rocket lifts off.

At approximately 141 seconds after launch at an altitude of roughly 64 km (40 mi), Super Heavy cuts off 28 of its 33 engines, leaving 5 engines running at reduced throttle. Starship then ignites its engines while still attached to the booster, and separates. The booster then rotates to an aft-first attitude, before relighting the 28 other engines for a "boostback burn" which stops all forward velocity, then switching to 13 engines and finally 3 to precisely target the landing area. After the boostback burn, the booster's engines shut off with Super Heavy on a trajectory for a controlled descent to the launch site using its three grid fins for minor course corrections. Roughly six minutes after launch, shortly before landing, it ignites its inner 13 engines, then shuts off all but the same 5 used for hot-staging, to perform a landing burn which slows it sufficiently to be finally caught by a pair of electric actuating arms attached to the launch tower. The booster landing and catch was successfully demonstrated for the first time on October 13, 2024, with the landing of Booster 12, and twice more with Boosters 14 and 15.

Meanwhile, the Starship spacecraft continues accelerating to orbital velocity with its six Raptor engines. Once in orbit, the spacecraft is planned to be able to be refueled by another Starship tanker variant. Musk has estimated that 8 launches would be needed to refuel a Starship in low Earth orbit completely. A NASA official estimated in 2023 that a Starship lunar landing would require launches "in the high teens", made in short succession because of cryogenic propellant boil-off. To land on bodies without an atmosphere, such as the Moon, Starship will fire its engines to slow down. To land on bodies with an atmosphere, such as the Earth and Mars, Starship first slows by entering the atmosphere using a heat shield. The spacecraft would then perform a "belly-flop" maneuver by diving through the atmosphere at a 60° angle to the ground, controlling its fall using four flaps at the front and aft of the spacecraft. Shortly before landing, the Raptor engines fire, using fuel from the header tanks, to perform a "landing flip" maneuver to return to a vertical orientation, with the Raptor engines' gimbaling helping to maneuver the craft. Omitting the thermal protection system, flaps, and tower-catch hardware for a guided atmospheric deceleration and "Mechazilla" tower catch allows for significant weight savings on the HLS and depot.

If Starship's second stage lands on a pad, a mobile hydraulic lift will move it to a transporter vehicle. If it lands on a floating platform, it will be transported by a barge to a port and then transported by road. The recovered Starship will either be positioned on the launch mount for another launch or refurbished at a SpaceX facility.

== Development ==
=== Early design concepts (2012–2019) ===
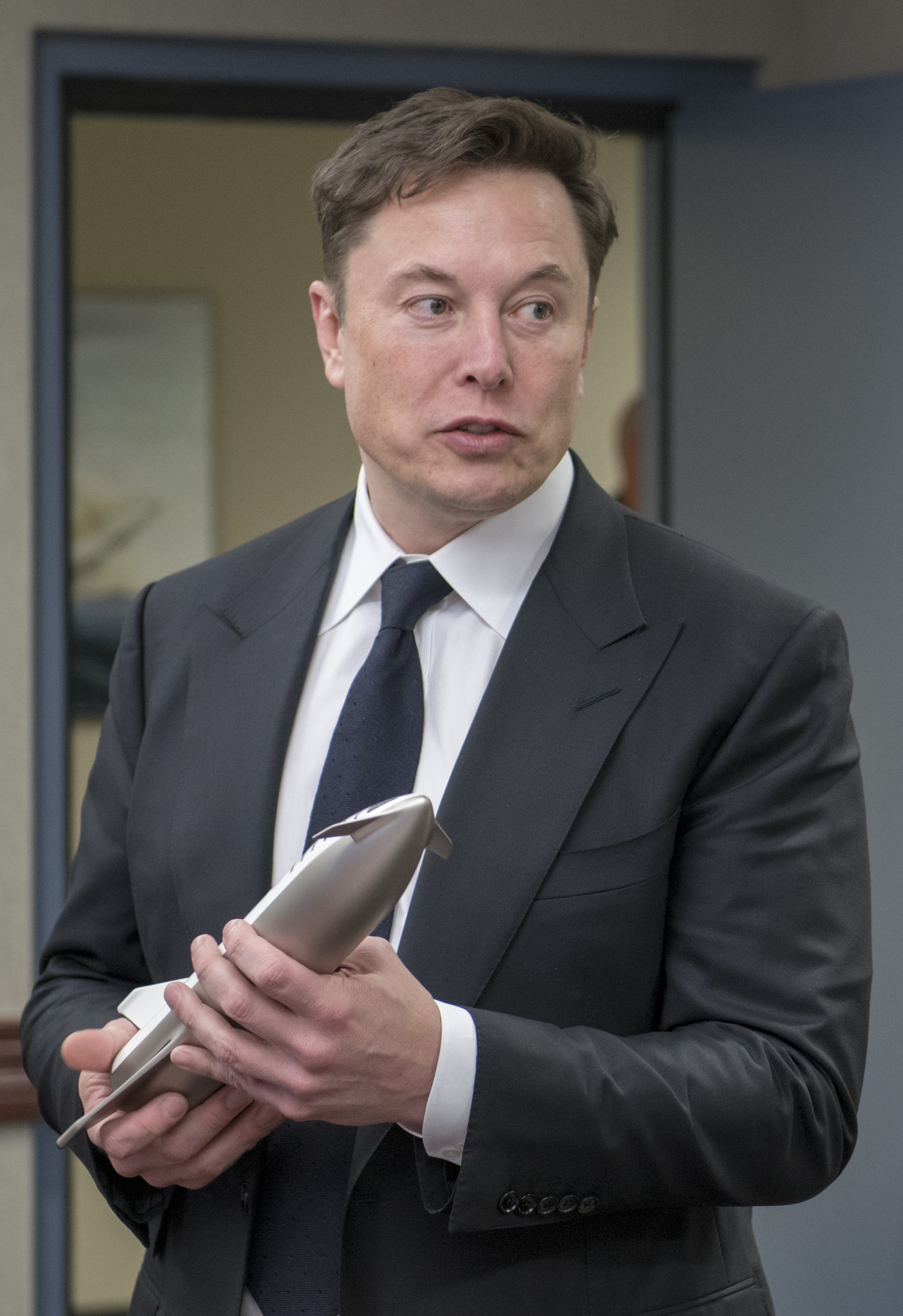
SpaceX CEO Elon Musk holding a model of BFR (Prior name of upper stage of Starship vehicle)

In November 2005, before SpaceX had launched its first rocket the Falcon 1, CEO Elon Musk first mentioned a high-capacity rocket concept able to launch 100 t (220,000 lb) to low Earth orbit, dubbed the BFR. Later in 2012, Elon Musk first publicly announced plans to develop a rocket surpassing the capabilities of Space X's existing Falcon 9. SpaceX called it the Mars Colonial Transporter, as the rocket was to transport humans to Mars and back. In 2016, the descriptor was changed to Interplanetary Transport System, as the rocket was planned to travel beyond Mars as well. The conceptual design called for a carbon fiber structure, a mass in excess of 10,000 t (22,000,000 lb) when fully fueled, a payload of 300 t (660,000 lb) to low Earth orbit while being fully reusable. By 2017, the concept was again re-dubbed the BFR.

In December 2018, the structural material was changed from carbon composites to stainless steel, marking the transition from early design concepts of the Starship. Musk cited numerous reasons for the change of material; low cost and ease of manufacture, increased strength of stainless steel at cryogenic temperatures, as well as its ability to withstand high heat. In 2019, SpaceX began to refer to the entire vehicle as Starship, with the second stage also being called Starship, and the booster Super Heavy. They also announced that Starship would use reusable heat-shield tiles similar to those of the Space Shuttle. The second-stage design had also settled on six Raptor engines by 2019: three optimized for sea-level and three optimized for vacuum. In 2019, SpaceX announced a change to the second stage's design, reducing the number of aft flaps from three to two to reduce weight. In March 2020 SpaceX released a Starship Users Guide, in which they stated the payload of Starship to Low Earth Orbit (LEO) would be over 100 t (220,000 lb), with a payload to GTO of 21 t (46,000 lb).

=== Low-altitude flight tests (2019–2021) ===
==== Starhopper to SN6 ====
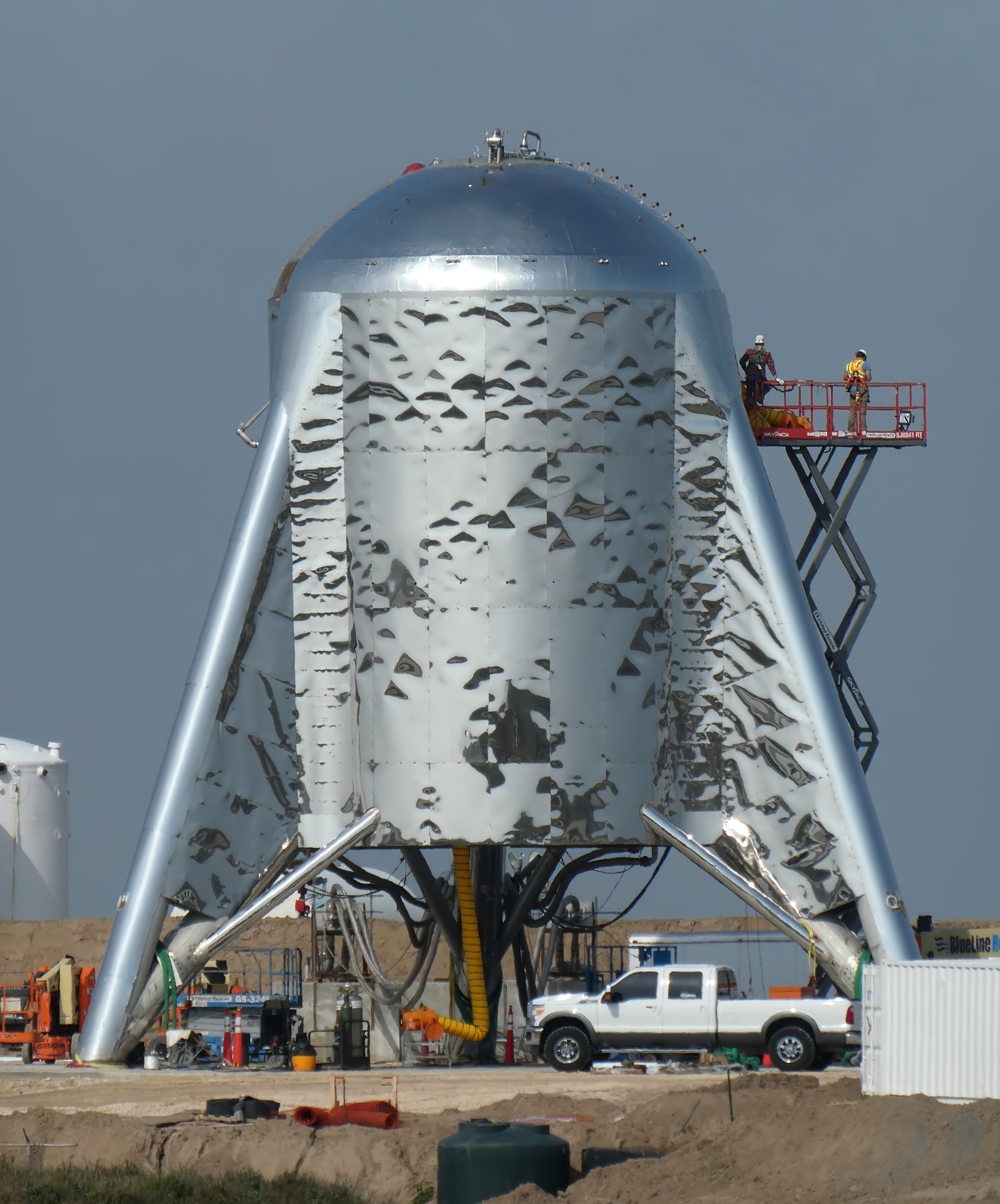
Starhopper under construction, March 2019

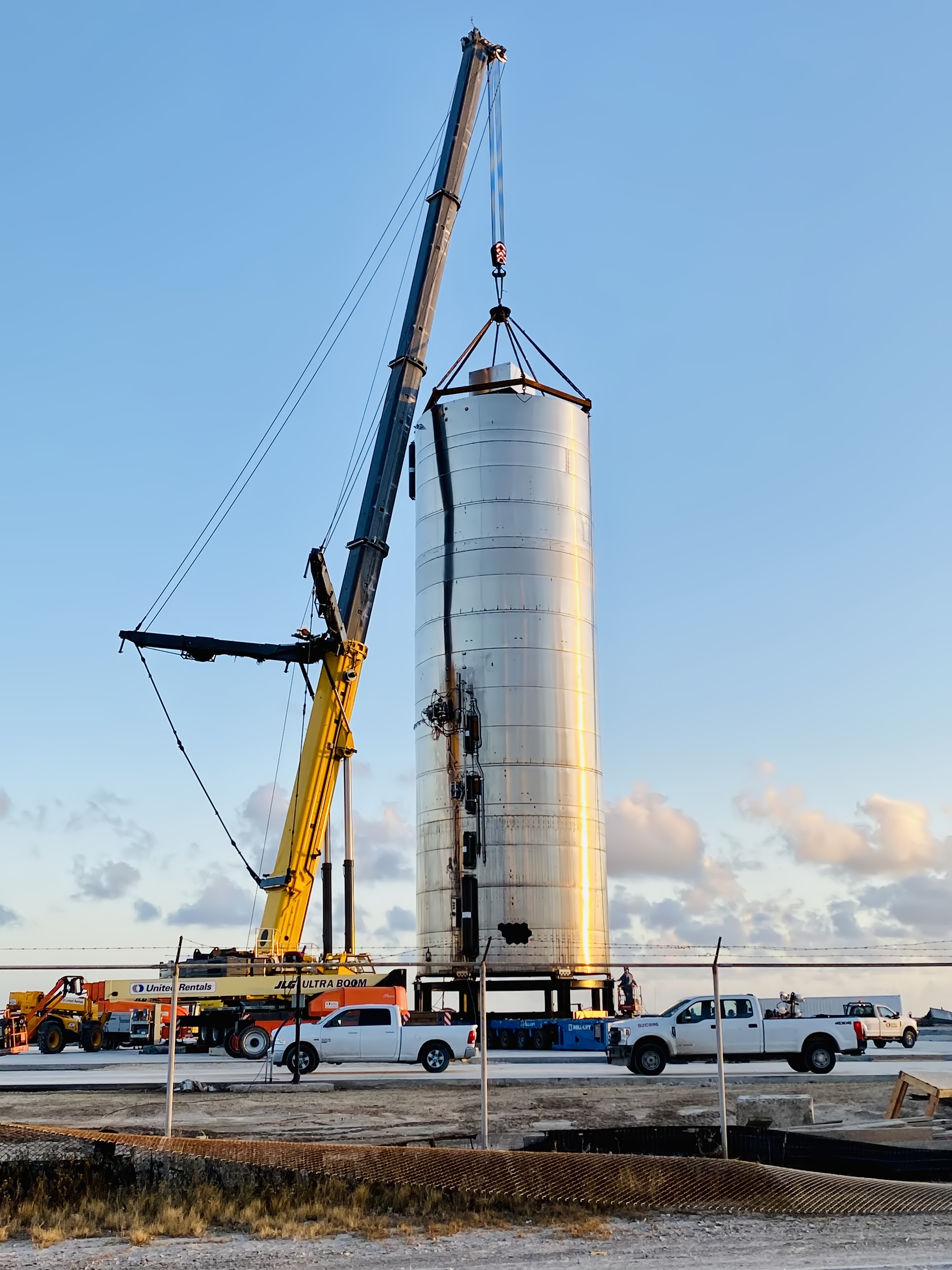
A crane lifting Starship SN5, August 2020

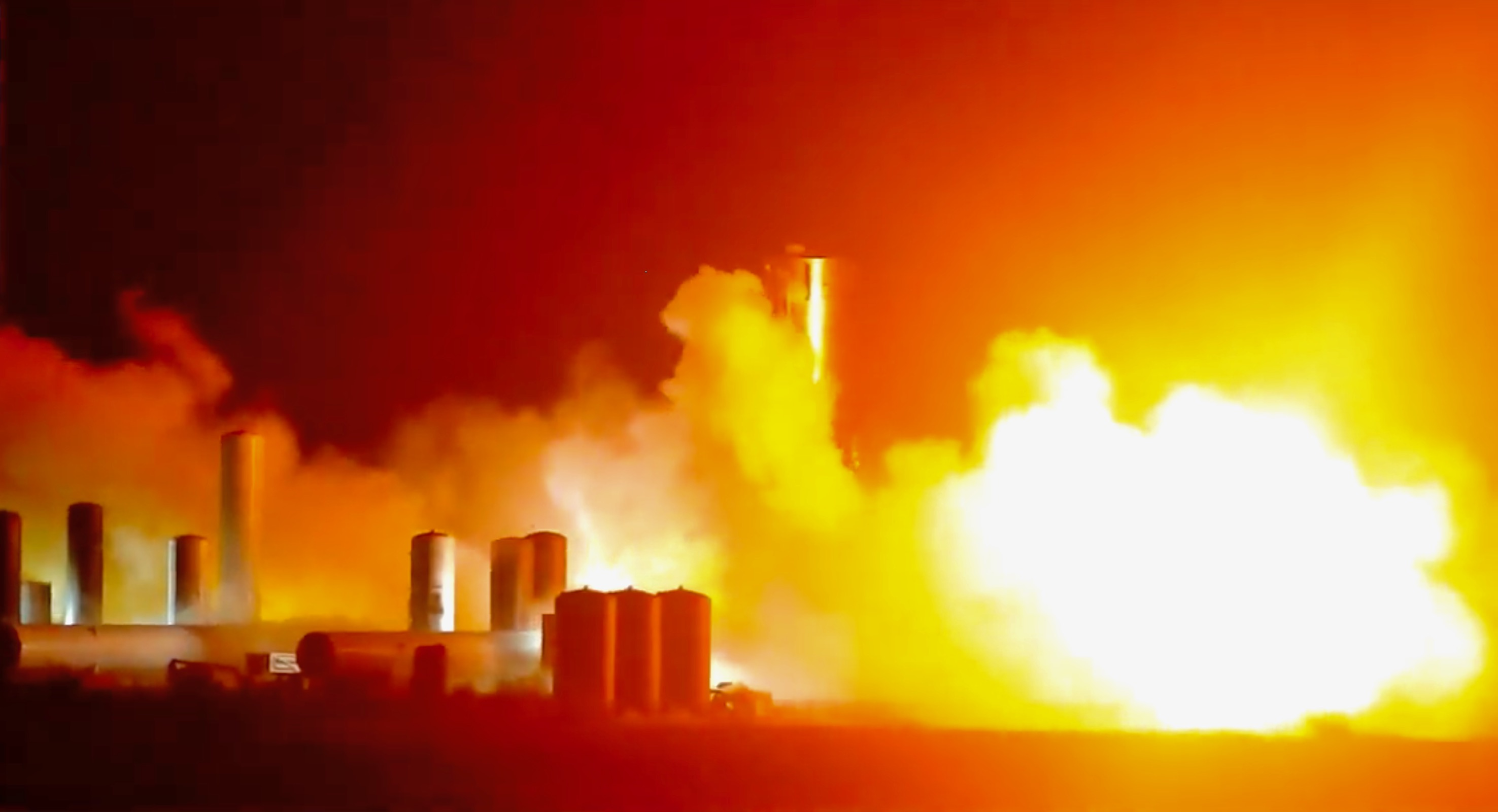
Static fire of SN4

The first tests started with the construction of the first prototype in 2018, Starhopper, which performed several static fires and two successful low-altitude flights in 2019. SpaceX began constructing the first full-size Starship MK1 and MK2 upper-stage prototypes before 2019, at the SpaceX facilities in Boca Chica, Texas, and Cocoa, Florida, respectively. Neither prototype flew: MK1 was destroyed in November 2019 during a pressure stress test and MK2's Florida facility was deconstructed throughout 2020. Prototypes were built using 301 stainless steel. This was noted for its corrosion resistance and lower cost compared to carbon fiber but faced some challenges, particularly with interlaminar toughness at cryogenic temperatures.

SpaceX then began naming its new Starship upper-stage prototypes with the prefix "SN", short for "serial number". No prototypes between SN1 and SN4 flew either—SN1 and SN3 collapsed during pressure stress tests, and SN4 exploded after its fifth engine firing.

In June 2020, SpaceX started constructing a launch pad for orbital Starship flights. The first flight-capable prototype, SN5, was cylindrical as it had no flaps or nose cone: just one Raptor engine, fuel tanks, and a mass simulator. On August 5, 2020, SN5 performed a 150 m (500 ft) high flight and successfully landed on a nearby pad. On September 3, 2020, the similar-looking Starship SN6 repeated the hop; later that month, a Raptor vacuum engine underwent its first full duration firing at McGregor, Texas.

==== SN8 to SN15 ====
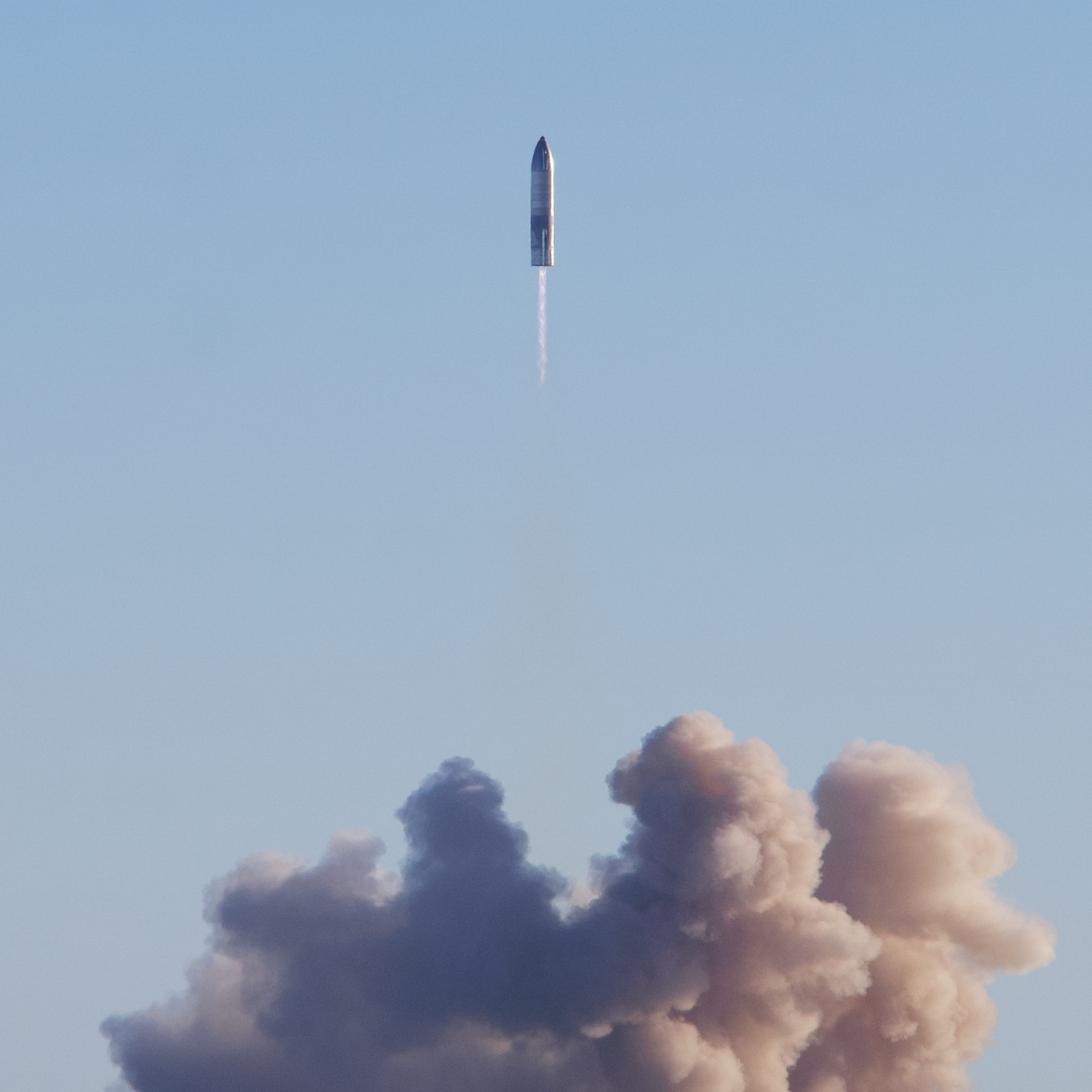
SN8 shortly after taking off, December 2020

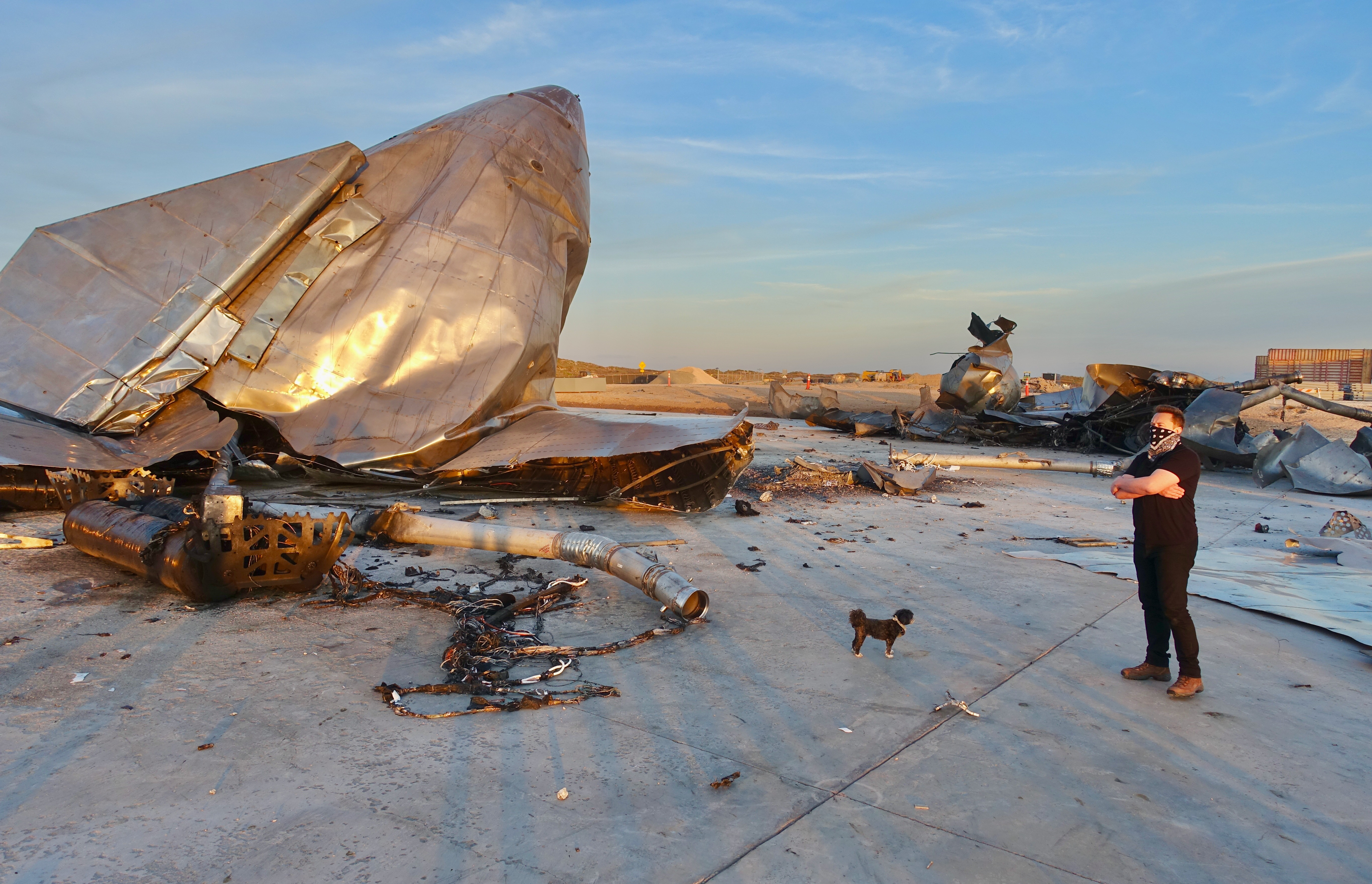
SN8 remains after hard landing and subsequent explosion

Computer animation depicting a successful high-altitude flight test such as SN10 and SN15

Starship SN8 was the first full-sized upper-stage prototype, though it lacked a heat shield. It underwent four preliminary static fire tests between October and November 2020. On December 9, 2020, SN8 flew, slowly turning off its three engines one by one, and reached an altitude of 12.5 km (7.8 mi). After SN8 dived back to the ground, its engines were hampered by low methane header tank pressure during the landing attempt, which led to a hard impact on the landing pad and subsequent explosion of the vehicle. SN7 used 304L stainless steel, which is less brittle and more weldable. Later vehicles used a proprietary alloy, 30X, whose composition is proprietary that costs slightly over €3.6/kg.

Because SpaceX had violated its launch license and ignored warnings of worsening shock wave damage, the Federal Aviation Administration investigated the incident for two months. During the SN8 launch, SpaceX ignored FAA warnings that the flight profile posed a risk of explosion. FAA space division chief Wayne Monteith said SpaceX's violation was "inconsistent with a strong safety culture", and criticized the company for proceeding with the launch "based on 'impressions' and 'assumptions,' rather than procedural checks and positive affirmations".

On February 2, 2021, Starship SN9 launched to 10 km (6.2 mi) in a flight path similar to SN8. The prototype crashed upon landing because one engine did not ignite properly. A month later, on March 3, Starship SN10 launched on the same flight path as SN9. The vehicle landed hard and crushed its landing legs, leaning to one side. A fire was seen at the vehicle's base and it exploded less than ten minutes later, potentially due to a propellant tank rupture. On March 30, Starship SN11 flew into thick fog along the same flight path. The vehicle exploded during descent, possibly due to excess propellant in a Raptor's methane turbopump.

In March 2021, the company disclosed a public construction plan for two sub-orbital launch pads, two orbital launch pads, two landing pads, two test stands, and a large propellant tank farm. The company soon proposed developing the surrounding Boca Chica Village, Texas, into a company town named Starbase. Locals raised concerns about SpaceX's authority, power, and a potential threat for eviction through eminent domain. In 2025, it was incorporated as Starbase, Texas.

In early April, the orbital launch pad's fuel storage tanks began mounting. SN12 through SN14 were scrapped before completion; SN15 was selected to fly instead, due to improved avionics, structure, and engines. On May 5, 2021, SN15 launched, completed the same maneuvers as older prototypes, and landed safely. SN15 had a fire in the engine area after landing but it was extinguished. According to a later report by SpaceX, SN15 experienced several issues while landing, including the loss of tank pressure and an engine.

=== Integrated flight tests (2023–2026) ===
In June 2022, the Federal Aviation Administration determined that SpaceX must address more than 75 issues identified in the preliminary environmental assessment before flight tests could start.

==== First flight test ====
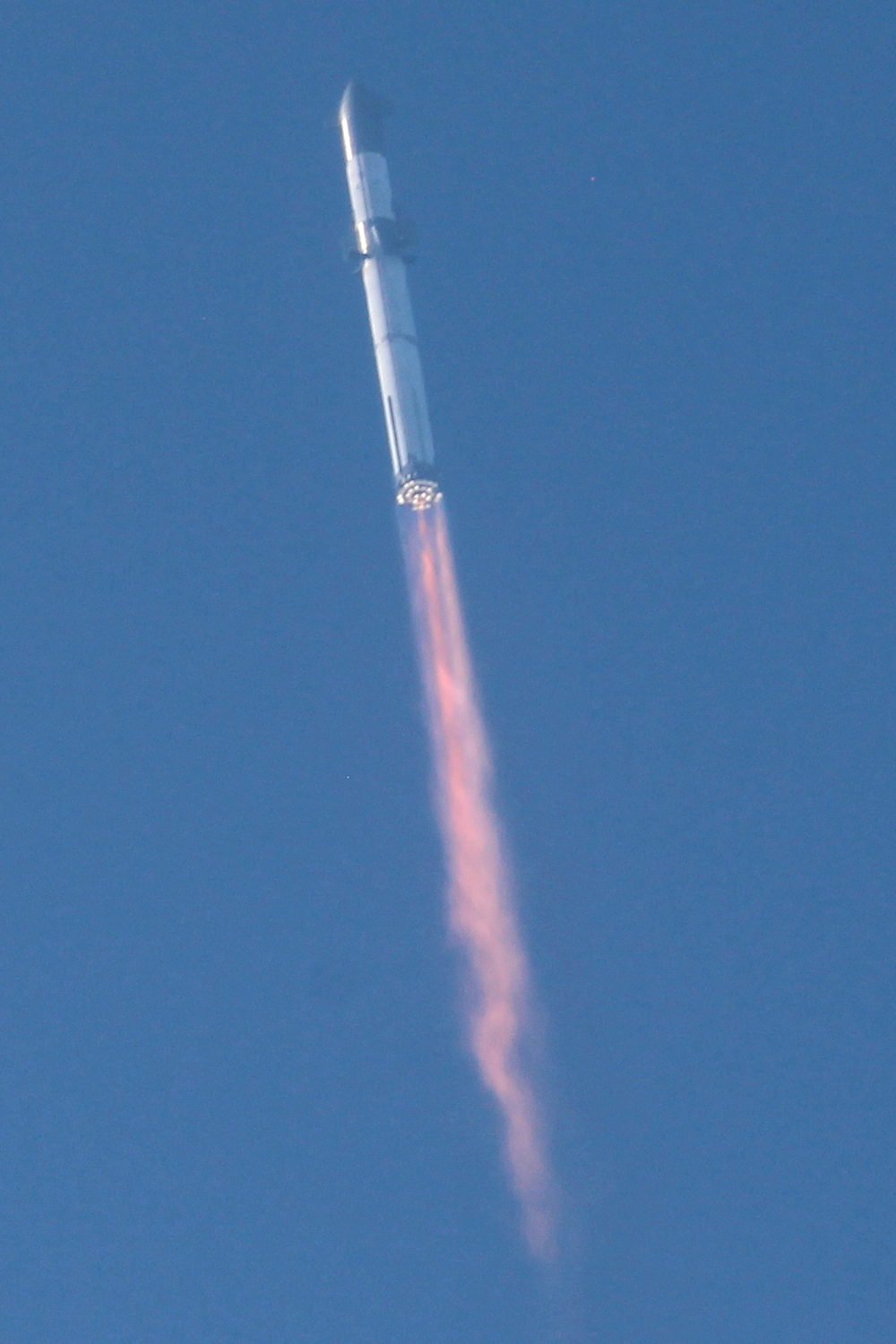
Starship during the first flight attempt. Several engines failed on the first stage.

In July 2022, Booster 7 tested the liquid oxygen turbopumps on all 33 Raptor engines, resulting in an explosion at the vehicle's base, which destroyed a pressure pipe and caused minor damage to the launchpad. By the end of November, Ship 24 had performed 2 static test fires, while Booster 7 had performed 6 static test fires and finally on February 9, 2023, a static fire with 31 engines at 50% throttle. In January 2023, the whole Starship stack underwent a full wet dress rehearsal.

After a launch attempt aborted on April 17, 2023, Booster 7 and Ship 24 lifted off on April 20 at 13:33 UTC in the first orbital flight test. Three engines were disabled during the launch sequence and several more failed during the flight. The booster later lost thrust vectoring control of the Raptor engines, which led to the rocket spinning out of control. The vehicle reached a maximum altitude of 24 mi (39 km). Approximately 3 minutes after lift-off the rocket's autonomous flight termination system was activated, though the vehicle tumbled for another 40 seconds before disintegrating. The first flight test blasted large amounts of sand and soil in the air, reaching communities within a 10.7 km (6.6 mi) radius. A brushfire on nearby state parkland also occurred, burning 3.5 acres (1.4 ha) of state parkland.

==== Second flight test ====
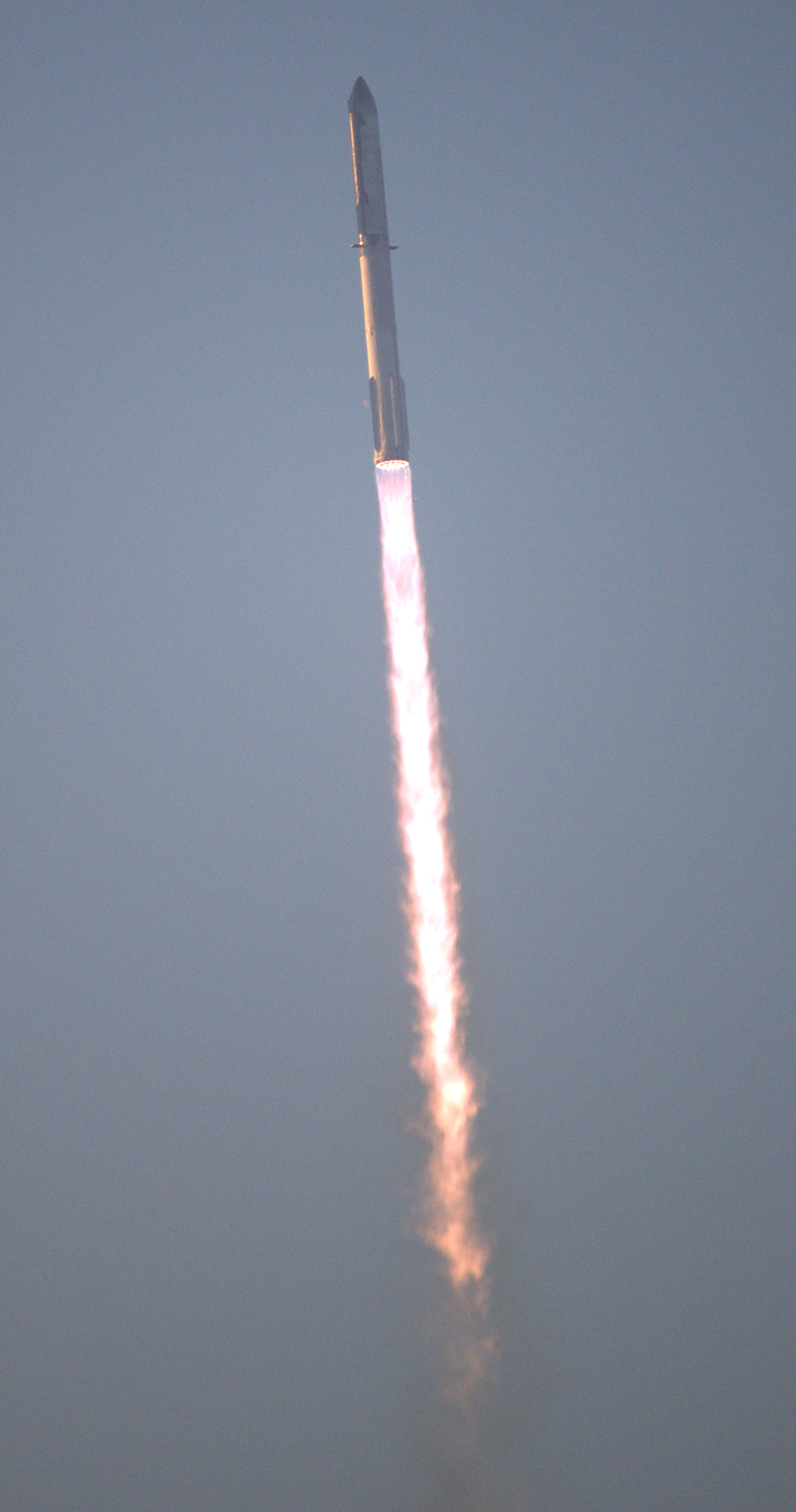
Starship during the second flight attempt

After the first test flight, SpaceX began work on the launch mount to repair the damage it sustained during the test and to prevent future issues. The foundation of the launch tower was reinforced and a water-powered flame deflector was built under the launch mount. Ship 25 and Booster 9 were rolled to the suborbital and orbital launch sites in May to undergo multiple tests.

On November 18, 2023, Booster 9 and Ship 25 lifted off the pad. All 33 engines continued to function until staging, where the second stage separated by pushing itself away from the first stage using a hot-staging technique. Following separation, the Super Heavy booster completed its flip maneuver and initiated the boostback burn, but then experienced multiple successive engine failures and exploded. Blockage in a liquid oxygen filter caused one of the engines to fail in a way that resulted in the destruction of the booster, which occurred three and a half minutes into the flight at an altitude of ~90 km over the Gulf of Mexico.

The second stage continued until it reached an altitude of ~149 kilometres (93 mi), after over eight minutes of flight; before engine cutoff, telemetry was lost on the second stage. SpaceX said that a safe command based on flight performance data triggered the flight termination system and destroyed the second stage, before completing its planned suborbital trajectory or attempting re-entry. It appeared to re-enter a few hundred miles north of the Virgin Islands, according to NOAA weather radar data.

==== Third flight test ====
Video of Starship during the third flight test

Following the second flight test (which saw the loss of both stages), significant changes were implemented, including upgrading Starship's thrust vector control system to electric thrust vector control (TVC) and measures to delay liquid oxygen (LOX) venting until after Starship engine cutoff (SECO) has taken place.

Flight 3 launched from the SpaceX Starbase facility along the South Texas coast around 8:25 a.m. CDT on March 14, 2024, coincidentally the 22nd anniversary of the founding of SpaceX. Like flight 2, all 33 engines on the booster ignited and stage separation was successful. B10 conducted a boostback burn, however, the planned landing in the Gulf of Mexico was not successful, as it exploded at 462 m (1,516 ft) above the surface.

The Starship spacecraft itself, after reaching space and orbital velocity, conducted several tests after engine cutoff, including initiating a propellant transfer demo and payload dispenser test. It attempted to re-enter the atmosphere, and at an altitude of around 65 km (40 mi), all telemetry from Ship 28 stopped, indicating a loss of the vehicle. This flight test demonstrated a cryogenic propellant transfer, by transferring propellant from the Ship's header tanks into its main tanks while in space, a technology which is required for Starship HLS to exit Low Earth orbit (LEO). The result of this test was declared successful by NASA and SpaceX. Additional data analysis is occurring on the fluid dynamics such as slosh and boil-off of the propellant.

==== Fourth flight test ====
The fourth flight test of the full Starship configuration launched on June 6, 2024, at 7:50 a.m. CDT. The goals for the test flight were for the Super Heavy booster to land on a 'virtual tower' in the ocean, and for the Ship to survive peak heating during atmospheric reentry. The flight test was successful in both regards, with Super Heavy achieving a soft splashdown and Ship surviving atmospheric reentry and a controlled splashdown despite significant damage to the flight control surfaces.

==== Fifth flight test ====
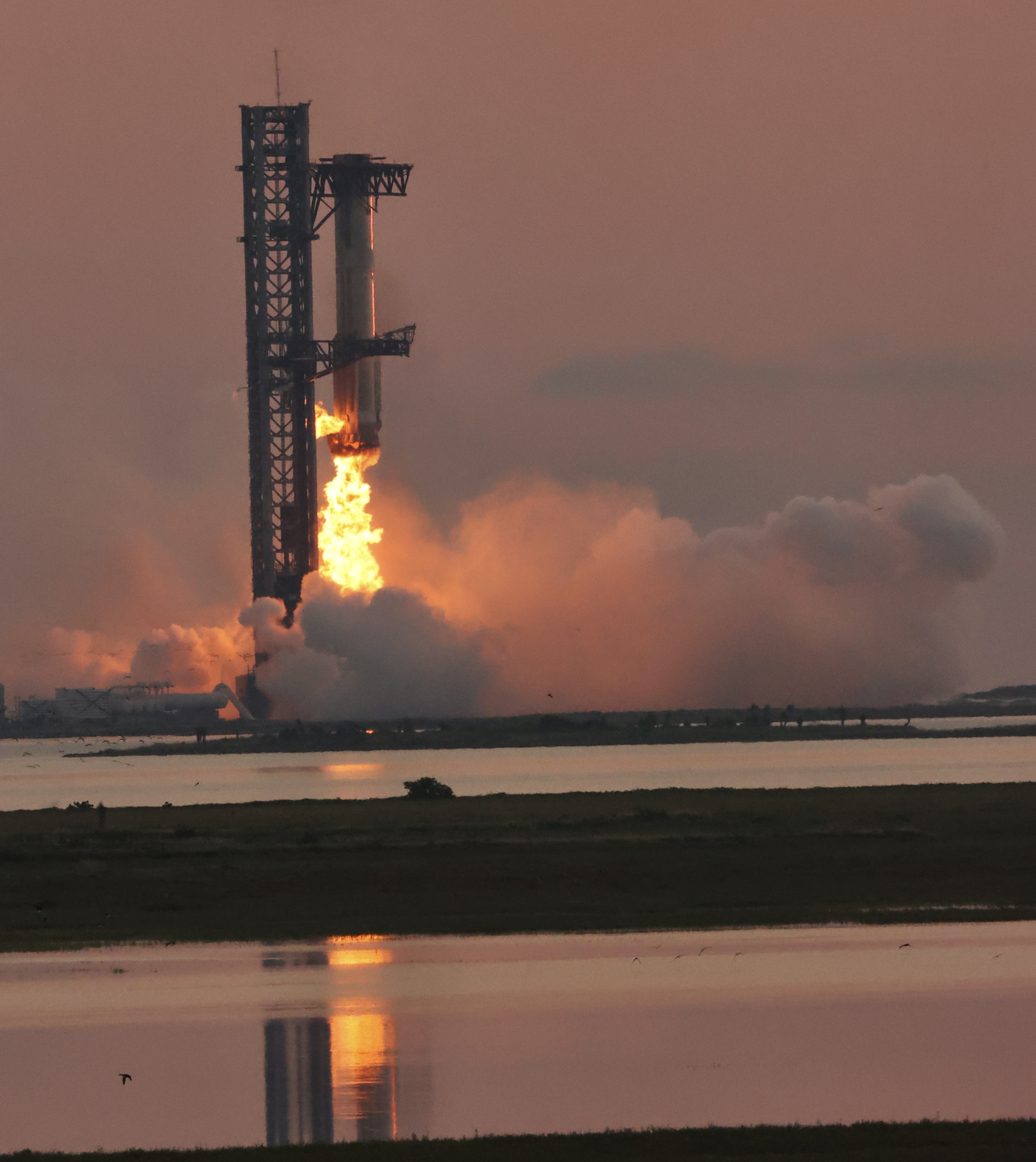
Booster 12 is successfully caught by the launch tower during flight test 5.

In April 2024, Musk stated one of the goals was to attempt a booster tower landing based on successful booster performance in flight 4. Vehicle testing commenced in May 2024. SpaceX claimed that B12 and S30 were ready to launch in early August, in advance of regulatory approval. SpaceX flew S30 and B12 on October 13, 2024, with B12 returning to the launch site for a successful catch for the first time, and S30 successfully splashing down in the Indian Ocean.

==== Sixth flight test ====
Ship 31 completed a successful cryogenic test in July 2024 and a static fire in September. Flight 6 was flown on November 19, 2024, with a water landing of the booster rather than a catch. Flight 6 was the first to successfully conduct a Raptor engine relight in the vacuum of space, paving the way for payload deployments on future flights. A stuffed toy banana served as the zero-g indicator, becoming Starship's first payload, though it remained within the vehicle for the duration of the flight. Eric Berger claimed that due to the success of the in-space relight, Starship would likely be "cleared to travel into orbit".

==== Seventh flight test ====
Ship 33 completed a successful cryogenic test in October 2024 and a static fire in late December. Booster 14 rolled out to OLP-1 and conducted a successful spin prime test and static fire in early December. Flight 7 was flown on January 16, 2025; the mission profile for flight test 7 was expected to be similar to the previous launch, targeting a splashdown in the Indian Ocean after attempting an in-space engine relight. Ship 33 was also expected to deploy ten Starlink "simulators," which were also expected to reenter over the Indian Ocean. Contact with Ship 33 was lost shortly before its engines were scheduled to shut down. Subsequently, Ship 33 was seen exploding as it flew over the Turks and Caicos Islands. The booster successfully returned to the launch site and was caught by the chopsticks on OLP-1. As a result of the explosion, numerous commercial airline flights were diverted or delayed.

==== Eighth flight test ====
On March 3, 2025, a launch attempt was aborted after multiple holds at T−40 seconds. Shortly before the scheduled launch at 6:45 p.m. CDT, an issue caused a hold for more than five minutes. The hold was briefly lifted, but a new hold was put in place due to issues connected to the Super Heavy booster. SpaceX called for a cancellation of the launch and set March 6 for the launch. The eighth flight test was later launched on March 6, 2025, at 23:30 hours UTC. The Super Heavy booster was successfully caught by the launch tower. During Ship 34's initial burn, four of its six engines experienced premature shutdowns that resulted in a loss of attitude control followed by a total loss of telemetry. The vehicle's breakup was observed from Florida, Jamaica, and the Turks and Caicos Islands. According to SpaceX, communications with the spacecraft ended 9 minutes and 30 seconds after liftoff. The flight was the second of the Block 2 Ship, and attempted to repeat the previous flight's profile. Due to the breakup of the vehicles, the Federal Aviation Administration briefly issued ground stop orders for multiple Florida airports.

==== Ninth flight test ====
Starship's ninth flight test launched on May 27, 2025, with Booster 14, the program's first reused Super Heavy booster. The booster completed its ascent, executed a boost-back and entry burn and re-entered at a higher angle of attack than previous flights, but was lost before its planned splashdown in the Gulf of Mexico. Ship 35 reached engine cutoff, yet a propellant leak caused loss of attitude control preventing reignition of a raptor engine and the payload bay door failed to open preventing deployment of the dummy starlink satellites; the vehicle broke up during re-entry.

==== Ship 36 explosion ====
On June 18, 2025, Ship 36, the Block 2 upper stage slated for the program's tenth flight test, exploded during a planned six-engine static-fire at SpaceX's Massey test stand near Starbase, Texas. Preliminary analysis suggested the failure of a composite-overwrapped pressure vessel (COPV) in the nose section, which ruptured and ignited methane and liquid-oxygen propellants. No personnel were injured, but SpaceX paused further testing to inspect Block 2 pressurization hardware and repair the damaged stand.

==== Tenth flight test ====
Starship's tenth flight test was scheduled for August 24, 2025, but was scrubbed shortly before liftoff. After a second aborted attempt on August 25, Flight 10 launched on August 26. The booster completed its ascent and boostback, then performed a landing burn experiment, intentionally disabling one center engine and using a backup engine, before hovering and splashing down in the Gulf of Mexico. The ship deployed eight Starlink simulators, the first successful payload demonstration from Starship, and relit a Raptor engine in space. It then reentered and made a controlled splashdown on target in the Indian Ocean.

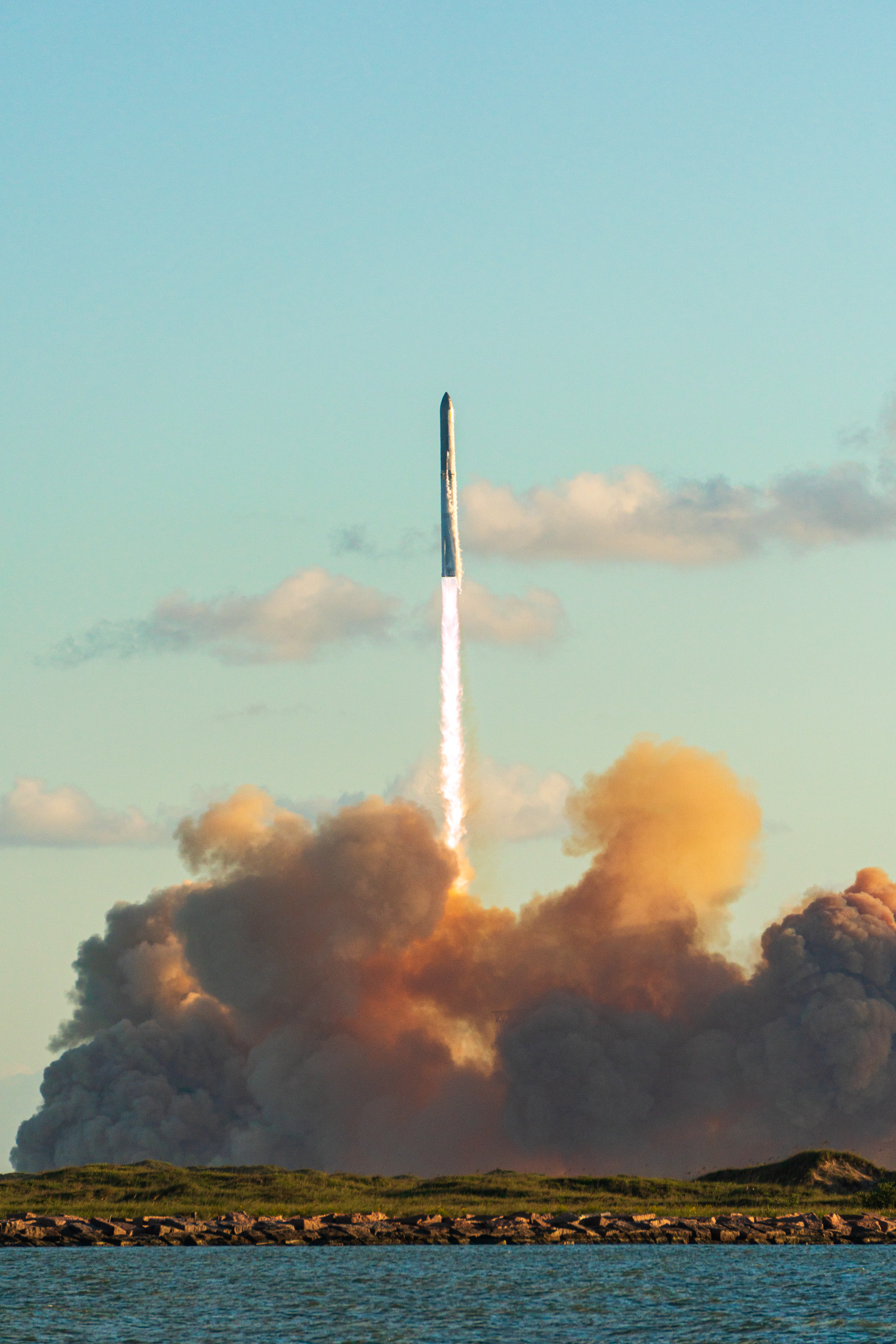
Liftoff Of Starship flight test eleven

==== Eleventh flight test ====
Starship's eleventh flight test launched on October 13, 2025, largely repeating the mission profile of the tenth flight. The reused Booster 15-2 completed its boostback burn with 12 of 13 planned engines. The engine that had failed to relight came back for the landing burn, which tested an engine configuration planned for the next-generation booster. The booster then hovered and splashed down in the Gulf of Mexico. Ship 38 deployed eight Starlink simulators and performed the third in-space Raptor relight. During reentry it flew a dynamic banking maneuver to mimic the trajectory of future returns to Starbase, then made a landing flip, landing burn and soft splashdown in the Indian Ocean. This was the final flight of the Block 2 Starship and of the original Pad 1 configuration.

==== Twelfth flight test ====
Starship's twelfth flight test launched on May 22, 2026, using Booster 19 and Ship 39. It was the first flight of the Starship V3 (Block 3) vehicles and Raptor 3 engines, and the first launch from Starbase's Pad 2. One of the booster's 33 engines shut down during ascent. After hot staging, the booster could not light all the engines planned for its boostback burn, ended the burn early, and hit the Gulf of Mexico hard after a landing-burn attempt. Ship 39 lost one of its three Raptor Vacuum engines during ascent but still reached its planned trajectory. It deployed 22 mock satellites, two of which carried cameras to image the ship's heat shield. SpaceX skipped the planned in-space engine relight, and the ship made a controlled splashdown in the Indian Ocean. The FAA classified the booster's loss as a mishap and required a SpaceX-led investigation before Flight 13.

==== Thirteenth flight test ====
Aiming to complete the same goals as flight 12, except with functional Starlink V3 satellites instead of mass simulators, Starship's thirteenth flight test was initially scheduled for July 16, 2026, but the attempt was aborted at the last second because of engine issues, and SpaceX replaced some first-stage Raptor engines. After a second scrub on July 23 due to weather, Flight 13 successfully launched on July 24 with booster 20 and ship 40. Booster 20 completed its ascent, stage separation and boostback, then attempted a soft splashdown in the Gulf of Mexico. Only five of the 13 engines planned for the landing burn appeared to ignite, and the booster hit the water harder than planned. Ship 40 nominally completed suborbital insertion and deployed 20 Starlink V3 satellites before successfully conducting an in-vacuum relight of one sea-level Raptor engine. Ship continued through reentry and achieved soft splashdown in the Indian Ocean, becoming the first Starship to remain intact after toppling over post-splashdown. SpaceX later recovered the floating ship and returned it to Starbase.

=== Orbital test and operational flights (2026-) ===
==== Flight fourteen ====
Marking a significant expansion of Starship's objectives, on September 28, 2026, flight 14 entered Earth orbit and completed the first operational Starlink deployment. The mission deployed 26 operational Starlink V3 satellites. During Ship 41's ascent, one of its three Raptor Vacuum engines shut down prematurely. SpaceX initially announced that the spacecraft would not commit to orbit, but reversed that decision after evaluating its condition. Approximately 25 minutes after liftoff, Ship 41 performed a short orbital-insertion burn using a single Raptor engine and entered orbit. SpaceX ended the flight early instead of completing the planned six-orbit, nearly 10-hour mission that was to end in the South Pacific west of Chile. Ship 41 splashed down in the North Pacific about 3 hours and 8 minutes after liftoff, then tipped over and exploded. The booster lost one of its 33 engines shortly after liftoff and made a soft splashdown in the Gulf of Mexico. No tower catch was attempted.

==== Flight fifteen ====
Flight 15 lifted off on the November 13, 2026, with Booster 22 and Ship 42. Booster 22 aborted catch and made an ocean splashdown like Booster 21. The next day on November 14, Ship 42 successfully completed 14 Earth orbits in about 22 hours of spaceflight, reentered and was caught by the tower, the first catch of a Starship upper stage.

== Cost and funding ==
SpaceX develops the Starship primarily with private funding. SpaceX Chief Financial Officer Bret Johnsen disclosed in court that SpaceX has invested more than $3 billion into the Starbase facility and Starship systems from July 2014 to May 2023. Elon Musk stated in April 2023 that SpaceX expected to spend about $2 billion on Starship development in 2023. In an October 2024 court filing opposing an environmental group's request to halt launches, SpaceX stated that maintaining Starbase and the Starship development program cost approximately $4 million per day. It added that each day of delay to milestone revenue would cost over $100,000 per day for every billion dollars delayed.

Musk has theorized that a Starship orbital launch might eventually cost SpaceX only $1 million to launch. Eurospace's director of research Pierre Lionnet stated in 2022 that Starship's launch price to customers would likely be higher because of the rocket's development cost. In an update on their website in late October 2025, SpaceX stated regarding Starship that "SpaceX is self-funding representing over 90% of system costs" [sic].

As part of the development of the Human Landing System for the Artemis program, SpaceX was awarded in April 2021 a $2.89 billion fixed-price contract from NASA to develop the Starship lunar lander for Artemis III. Blue Origin, a bidding competitor to SpaceX, disputed the decision and began a legal case against NASA and SpaceX in August 2021, causing NASA to suspend the contract for three months until the case was dismissed in the Court of Federal Claims. Two years later Blue Origin was awarded a $3.4 billion fixed-price contract for its lunar lander.

In 2022, NASA awarded SpaceX a $1.15 billion fixed-price contract for a second lunar lander for Artemis IV. The same year, SpaceX was awarded a $102 million five-year contract to develop the Rocket Cargo program for the United States Space Force.

== Launch history ==
=== Summary ===
Starship launch history by years
Year	Launches	Success	Failure	Booster landings	Ship landings
2023	2	0	2	0	0
2024	4	4	0	1	0
2025	5	2	3	2	0
2026	4	4	0	0	1
Total	15	10	5	3	1

=== 2023 ===
Flight No.	Date and time (UTC)	Version, booster (Note: Starship vehicles have a multiple-digit serial number, followed by a hyphen and a number that indicates the flight count. Starship vehicles are in a S#-# format, while boosters are B#-#. For example, B14‑1 and B14‑2 represent the first and second flights of B14. Vehicles without a hyphen were either expended on their first flight or retired after recovery. Missions where a new vehicle is used are marked with a mint-colored background.)	Version, ship	Launch site	Payload	Payload mass	Orbit	Customer	Launch outcome	Booster landing	Ship landing
1	April 20, 2023; 13:33:09	Block 1 B7	Block 1 S24	Starbase, OLP‑1	—N/a	—N/a	Transatmospheric	SpaceX	Failure	Precluded	Precluded
1	Flight 1 was the first with a ship integrated with the Super Heavy booster, the booster was planned to make a powered splashdown in the Gulf of Mexico, and the ship would enter a transatmospheric Earth orbit before reentering and impacting the Pacific Ocean north of Hawaii. Several engines were shut down before and during flight. The vehicle eventually entered an uncontrolled spin before stage separation due to loss of thrust vector control. The flight termination system activated but the vehicle remained intact for 40 more seconds. SpaceX declared this flight a success, as their primary goal was to only clear the pad. The launch resulted in extensive damage to the orbital launch mount and the infrastructures around it, including the propellant tank farm.										
2	November 18, 2023; 13:02:50	Block 1 B9	Block 1 S25	Starbase, OLP‑1	—N/a	—N/a	Transatmospheric	SpaceX	Failure	Failure (gulf)	Precluded
2	Flight 2 had a test flight profile similar to the first flight, with the addition of a new hot-staging technique and the introduction of a water deluge system as part of the ground support equipment at the launch pad. During the first stage ascent, all 33 engines fired to full duration. Starship and Super Heavy successfully accomplished a hot-staging separation. After initiating a flip maneuver and initiating boostback burn, the booster suffered engine shutdowns and was lost. The upper stage ascended nominally until the automated flight termination system destroyed it due to loss of communications from a fire.										

=== 2024 ===
Flight No.	Date and time (UTC)	Version, booster	Version, ship	Launch site	Payload	Payload mass	Orbit	Customer	Launch outcome	Booster landing	Ship landing
3	March 14, 2024; 13:25:00	Block 1 B10	Block 1 S28	Starbase, OLP‑1	—N/a	—N/a	Suborbital	SpaceX	Success	Failure (gulf)	Failure (ocean)
3	Flight 3 included a full-duration burn of the second-stage engines, an internal propellant-transfer demonstration, and a test of the Starlink dispenser door. The planned in-space engine relight of the spacecraft and its hard splashdown into the Indian Ocean did not occur. The booster successfully propelled the spacecraft to staging, with 13 engines ignited for a boostback burn, though six engines shut down prematurely. During the landing burn ignition, only three engines ignited, and the booster was lost around 400 meters above the ocean. At reentry, Ship had an uncontrolled roll and lost telemetry, leading SpaceX to conclude the ship was lost during reentry.										
4	June 6, 2024; 12:50:00	Block 1 B11	Block 1 S29	Starbase, OLP‑1	—N/a	—N/a	Suborbital	SpaceX	Success	Controlled (gulf)	Controlled (ocean)
4	Flight 4 flew a similar trajectory to Flight 3, with the addition of a ship landing burn and soft splashdown. One Raptor engine was lost shortly after liftoff, but the booster performed in accordance to its flight profile and conducted a controlled splashdown in the Gulf of Mexico on a "virtual tower", in preparation for a catch by the launch tower during Flight 5. The spacecraft performed a successful reentry despite severe forward flap damage and conducted a controlled splashdown in the Indian Ocean, within the target region but 6 kilometers from the center.										
5	October 13, 2024; 12:25:00	Block 1 B12	Block 1 S30	Starbase, OLP‑1	—N/a	—N/a	Suborbital	SpaceX	Success	Success (OLP-1)	Controlled (ocean)
5	Flight 5 was the first to achieve booster recovery and complete a flight without engine failures. After stage separation, the booster returned to the launch site and was caught by the launch tower arms despite damage to a chine during descent. Following a coast phase, Ship 30 reentered the atmosphere, performed reentry despite forward flap damage, and executed a landing burn, splashing down at its target in the Indian Ocean.										
6	November 19, 2024; 22:00:00	Block 1 B13	Block 1 S31	Starbase, OLP‑1	Plush banana	Unknown	Transatmospheric	SpaceX	Success	^{Controlled (gulf)} _{Abort (OLP‑1)}	Controlled (ocean)
6	Flight 6 was the second attempt at booster recovery and the final use of a Block 1 upper stage. Heat shield tiles were removed from key areas of Ship 31, which also lacked the ablative backup layer from Flight 5. Following stage separation, the booster was diverted to the ocean near the launch site due to damage to the catch tower during liftoff. The ship completed an in-space engine relight test and re-entered, splashing down in the Indian Ocean during daylight—a first for Starship. Despite a reduced heat shield and steeper re-entry trajectory, Ship 31 sustained minimal flap damage. The flight also carried Starship's first payload, a toy stuffed banana serving as the zero-gravity indicator, which remained onboard throughout the mission.										

=== 2025 ===
In a talk in November 2024, Starbase General Manager Kathy Lueders announced that SpaceX hoped to be able to catch a Starship upper stage sometime in the next 6 months and have as many as 25 launches in 2025. This did not occur. Starship was launched five times in 2025.

Flight No.	Date and time (UTC)	Version, booster	Version, ship	Launch site	Payload	Payload mass	Orbit	Customer	Launch outcome	Booster landing	Ship landing
7	January 16, 2025; 22:37:00	Block 2 B14‑1	Block 2 S33	Starbase, OLP‑1	10 Starlink simulator satellites	~20,000 kg (44,000 lb)	Transatmospheric	SpaceX	Failure	Success (OLP-1)	Precluded
7	Flight 7 was to follow a trajectory similar to the previous mission, with a planned splashdown in the Indian Ocean approximately one hour post-launch. It marked the inaugural flight of a Block 2 Ship, featuring structural, avionics, and other upgrades. The mission also aimed to test the deployment system for 10 Starlink mass simulator satellites. During the Ship's initial burn, its engines experienced premature shutdowns due to a propellant leak larger than the Ship's systems could handle, followed by a total loss of telemetry. SpaceX stated the autonomous flight safety system destroyed the Ship about three minutes after loss of telemetry. The booster successfully returned to the launch site, where it was caught by the launch tower arms on OLP-1 without noticeable damage to the chines.										
8	March 6, 2025; 23:31:02	Block 2 B15‑1	Block 2 S34	Starbase, OLP‑1	4 Starlink simulator satellites	~8,000 kg (18,000 lb)	Transatmospheric	SpaceX	Failure	Success (OLP-1)	Precluded
8	Flight 8 was to follow a trajectory similar to the previous mission, with a planned splashdown in the Indian Ocean. During the Ship's initial burn, several engines shut down and the Ship lost control and later telemetry. The booster was successfully commanded to return to the launch site despite having two engines fail to relight for its boostback burn. One of the failed engines managed to reignite for the catch, which was successful.										
9	May 27, 2025; 23:36:28	Block 2 B14-2	Block 2 S35	Starbase, OLP‑1	8 Starlink simulator satellites	~16,000 kg (35,000 lb)	Transatmospheric	SpaceX	Failure	Failure (gulf)	Failure (ocean)
9	Flight 9 was the first to reuse a Super Heavy booster, along with 29 engines having been used on a flight, which completed ascent and boostback into a high angle of attack but was lost before splashdown in the Gulf of Mexico. The ship reached engine cutoff but failed to deploy its payload of eight Starlink simulator satellites and experienced a fuel leak, resulting in a loss of control. The ship was passivated before reentry and broke up over the Indian Ocean.										
10	August 26, 2025; 23:30:00	Block 2 B16	Block 2 S37	Starbase, OLP‑1	8 Starlink simulator satellites	~16,000 kg (35,000 lb)	Transatmospheric	SpaceX	Success	Controlled (gulf)	Controlled (ocean)
10	Flight 10 was delayed by around two months because the ship originally designated for the flight was lost during testing. The booster ignited all thirty-three engines, though it lost one during the ascent burn. It would continue to complete its mission, splashing down in the Gulf of Mexico after simulating an engine out. The ship reached the desired trajectory and deployed all eight of its Starlink simulators. It then relit a single Raptor engine in space, followed by atmospheric entry. During descent through the atmosphere, there was substantial damage to the engine section. Despite this, S37 was able to softly splash down within three meters of its target site in the Indian Ocean.										
11	October 13, 2025; 23:23:00	Block 2 B15‑2	Block 2 S38	Starbase, OLP‑1	8 Starlink simulator satellites	~16,000 kg (35,000 lb)	Transatmospheric	SpaceX	Success	Controlled (gulf)	Controlled (ocean)
11	Flight 11 was the last flight of Block 2 vehicles, as well as the last flight from Pad-1 before its retrofit. It flew a similar profile to the previous two flights, with twenty-four engines flying for a second time on Booster 15. The booster performed nominally during its flight, with the only anomaly being the loss of a Raptor engine on the boostback burn, though it would later reignite on the landing burn. The ship, like on the previous flight, made it to SECO before deploying its eight Starlink simulators. Following this, a single Raptor engine was lit in space, with the ship reentering shortly afterwards. Unlike on Flight 10, the ship was mostly undamaged from heat on reentry, despite the intentional removal of several tiles. S38 landed on target in the Indian Ocean.										

=== 2026 ===
Flight No.	Date and time (UTC)	Version, booster	Version, ship	Launch site	Payload	Payload mass	Orbit	Customer	Launch outcome	Booster landing	Ship landing
12	May 22, 2026; 22:30:00	Block 3 B19	Block 3 S39	Starbase, OLP‑2	20 Starlink simulator satellites & 2 modified Starlink V3	~37,500 kg (82,700 lb)	Transatmospheric	SpaceX	Success	Failure (gulf)	Controlled (ocean)
12	Flight 12 was originally intended to feature Booster 18 and Ship 39; however, Booster 18 was scrapped after sustaining severe damage during testing. This mission marked the debut of the "Block 3" vehicle iteration and the inaugural use of Starbase's second launch pad. It aimed for the controlled splashdown of both the Booster and the Ship. The mission followed a flight profile similar to previous tests, with the ship targeting a trajectory just shy of orbit. During ascent, the booster performed nominally despite losing a single outboard Raptor engine. However, following hot-staging, Booster 19 only successfully relit 20 of the 33 engines intended for the boostback burn, the majority of which failed during startup. The burn was then aborted after only a few seconds. During the landing sequence, only one engine relit, leading the vehicle to impact the water at high speed. Ship 39 suffered the loss of one Raptor Vacuum engine during its ascent, but the vehicle's engine-out capability allowed it to successfully reach its scheduled engine cutoff (SECO). While the ship successfully deployed 20 satellite mass simulators and two modified functional Starlink satellites, the planned in-space Raptor relight was skipped. The two functional satellites were used to test upcoming Starlink V3 hardware, capture and relay footage of the Starship in space, and inspect its heat shield. Finally, the ship completed a nominal reentry and a successful landing flip using two engines as planned.										
13	July 24, 2026; 22:51:00	Block 3 B20	Block 3 S40	Starbase, OLP‑2	20 Starlink V3	~34,000 kg (75,000 lb) (Note: Extrapolated from payload mass of flight 12.)	Transatmospheric	SpaceX	Success	Failure (gulf)	Controlled (ocean)
13	Flight 13 followed a flight profile similar to previous tests. Liftoff, hot staging and boostback were nominal. During the attempted landing burn, Booster 20 only lit 10 of the planned 13 engines on the landing burn and after losing five more, impacted the water at high speed. Flight 13 featured the first deployment of Starlink V3 satellites, which followed the trajectory of the ship and, after testing, burned up in the atmosphere as planned. After its simulated landing over the Indian Ocean, the ship splashed down and tipped over as planned. For the first time, the ship survived this, allowing SpaceX to get more images of the heat shield tiles, flaps and engine bay afterwards.										
14	September 28, 2026; 12:48	Block 3 B21	Block 3 S41	Starbase, OLP‑2	Starlink: Group 31-1	~44,000 kg (97,000 lb)	LEO	SpaceX	Success	Controlled (gulf)	Controlled (ocean)
14	Flight 14 was Starship's first orbital mission and first deployment of an operational payload. Booster 21 completed ascent, hot-staging and boostback before making a controlled splashdown in the Gulf of Mexico, despite several engines shutting down during descent. During ascent, one of Ship 41's engines shut down prematurely, but flight controllers proceeded with orbital insertion. Ship 41 reached an orbit at an altitude of approximately 275 kilometres (171 mi), deployed all 26 Starlink V3 satellites, and made a controlled splashdown in the Pacific Ocean at about 15:57 UTC, roughly three hours after launch. The planned six-orbit mission was shortened to just under two orbits following payload deployment and an initial health check, foregoing the planned coast period.										
15	November 13, 2026; 22:47:36	Block 3 B22	Block 3 S42	Starbase, OLP‑2	Starlink Group 31-2	~44,000 kg (97,000 lb)	LEO	SpaceX	Success	^{Controlled (gulf)} _{Abort (OLP‑2)}	Success (OLP-2)
15	Flight 15 was planned to attempt the first catch of Starship's upper stage on this flight, alongside a booster catch, which had not been attempted since Flight 8. After staging, the booster began to perform the boostback burn. However, it was cut short due to insufficient fuel quantities, and Booster 22 diverted to an offshore splashdown successfully. The ship deployed all 26 Starlink satellites and returned to Starbase twenty-two and a half hours after being launched, which made for the longest Starship flight to date. S42 was caught by the launch tower, nicknamed Mechazilla, around 22 hours after it lifted off there. This was the first time a Starship upper stage was caught by the tower.										

=== Future launches ===
Future launches are listed chronologically when firm plans are in place. Launches are expected to take place "no earlier than" (NET) the listed date.

=== 2026 ===
Date and time (UTC)	Version, booster	Version, ship	Launch site	Payload	Orbit	Customer
December 10, 2026	Block 3 B23	Block 3 S43	Kennedy, LC-39A	Starlink 30-1	LEO	SpaceX
December 10, 2026	Flight 16 is scheduled for no earlier than December 10, 2026, with the Starlink 30-1 mission. It is expected to be the first Starship mission to launch from Launch Complex 39A at the Kennedy Space Center in Florida.					

=== 2027 ===
Date and time (UTC)	Version, booster	Version, ship	Launch site	Payload	Orbit	Customer
Q1 2027	Block 3	Block 3	TBA	—N/a	LEO	NASA
Q1 2027	Launch of the Starship target (a prototype version of the Propellant Depot) for the propellant transfer demonstration mission.					
Q1 2027	Block 3	Block 3	TBA	Propellant	LEO	NASA
Q1 2027	Launch of the Starship chaser (a prototype version of the tanker) for the propellant transfer demonstration mission.					
Mid 2027	Block 3	Block 3	TBA	Artemis III	LEO	NASA
Mid 2027	Artemis III will conduct a docking test in low Earth orbit between Orion and a prototype Starship Human Landing System (HLS). Starship will serve as a docking target with an IDSS port mounted on its nose.					
2027	Unknown	Unknown	TBA	Superbird-9	GTO	SKY Perfect JSAT
2027	Superbird-9 is a high-throughput satellite for SKY Perfect JSAT, based on Airbus's OneSat product line.					
2027	Unknown	Depot	TBA	Propellant Depot	LEO	NASA
2027	Launch of a Starship propellant depot into low Earth orbit for long-term storage propellant delivered by Starship tanker spacecraft for subsequent transfer to a Starship HLS vehicle.					
Q3 2027	Unknown	Unknown	TBA	Propellant	LEO	NASA
Q3 2027	A series of Starship tanker launches to deliver propellant to the depot. An estimated six to 22 launches are required to support the uncrewed Starship HLS lunar landing demonstration mission.					
Q4 2027	Unknown	HLS	TBA	Uncrewed Lunar Demo	Lunar	NASA
Q4 2027	Uncrewed Starship HLS demonstration mission to the Moon, including a lunar landing and return to lunar orbit, planned before the crewed Artemis IV mission.					
2027	Unknown	HLS	TBA	Astrolab FLEX rover Possible rideshare	Lunar	Astrolab
2027	Flexible Logistics and Exploration (FLEX) rover will include 1,000 kilograms (2,200 lb) of customer payloads.					
2027	Unknown	HLS	TBA	ISRU Processing System Possible rideshare	Lunar	LSA
2027	In April 2023, the Luxembourg Space Agency (LSA) and OffWorld Europe announced a partnership to develop a system for extracting, processing, storing, and using water ice from the lunar surface through in situ resource utilization. Overseen by the European Space Agency, the project combines LSA's and OffWorld Europe's expertise, with a technology demonstration planned for launch to the Moon in 2027 aboard the first Starship HLS mission for the Artemis program. The mission is expected to require an estimated high-teens number of Starship refueling flights beforehand.					

=== 2028 and beyond ===
Date and time (UTC)	Version, booster	Version, ship	Launch site	Payload	Orbit	Customer
2028	Unknown	Depot	TBA	Propellant Depot	LEO	NASA
2028	SpaceX will launch a depot to store propellant for Human Landing System (HLS) flights.					
2028	Unknown	Unknown	Propellant	Propellant	LEO	NASA
2028	Tanker launch for Artemis IV. At least one tanker will be needed for most launches beyond LEO, and anywhere from six to twenty two tanker flights for a lunar landing.					
2028	Unknown	HLS	TBA	Crewed Lunar Demo	Lunar	NASA
2028	Artemis IV is expected to be the first crewed lunar landing since Apollo 17. An unknown number of refueling flights, estimated to be in the high tens, will be required prior to the mission.					
2029	Unknown	Unknown	TBA	Starlab	LEO	Voyager Space/Airbus
2029	Starlab is a planned commercial space station.					
2029	Unknown	HLS	TBA	Eagle Rover Possible rideshare	Lunar	Lunar Outpost
2029	The Eagle Rover has been selected by NASA for study as a Lunar Terrain Vehicle.					
2029	Unknown	Unknown	TBA	Starfall Capsule	TBA	Exolaunch
2029	An unspecified payload for Exolaunch carried by one or more Starfall capsules.					
2030	Unknown	Unknown	TBA	Haven-2 Core Module	LEO	VAST
2030	Launch of Haven-2 Core module.					
2032	Unknown	HLS	TBA	Lunar Cruiser Possible rideshare	Lunar	JAXA/NASA
2032	The Lunar Cruiser is a crewed pressurized lunar rover being developed jointly by JAXA and Toyota that astronauts can drive and live in on the Moon.					
2035	Unknown	Unknown	TBA	Vast artificial gravity station Module 1	LEO	VAST
2035	First module for Vast's 100 m spinning artificial gravity station.					
2035	Unknown	Unknown	TBA	Vast artificial gravity station Module 2	LEO	VAST
2035	Second module for Vast's artificial gravity station.					
2035	Unknown	Unknown	TBA	Vast artificial gravity station Module 3	LEO	VAST
2035	Third module for Vast's artificial gravity station.					
2035	Unknown	Unknown	TBA	Vast artificial gravity station Module 4	LEO	VAST
2035	Fourth module for Vast's artificial gravity station.					
2035	Unknown	Unknown	TBA	Vast artificial gravity station Module 5	LEO	VAST
2035	Fifth module for Vast's artificial gravity station.					
2035	Unknown	Unknown	TBA	Vast artificial gravity station Module 6	LEO	VAST
2035	Sixth module for Vast's artificial gravity station.					
TBA	Unknown	Unknown	TBA	Uncrewed Mars Demo	TMI	
TBA	SpaceX plans to launch around five Starship upper stages to Mars, which would attempt to land on an as of yet unspecified location on the Martian surface upon arrival at Mars, as part of their iterative and incremental cycle of development. The Italian Space Agency contracted SpaceX in 2025 for delivering several experiments to the Martian surface on the first Starship flight to Mars.					

== Potential missions ==
=== Starlink ===
SpaceX plans to use Starship to launch the second generation of satellites for SpaceX's Starlink system, which as of 2021 delivered high-speed internet to over 70 countries. An analyst at financial services company Morgan Stanley stated development of Starship and Starlink are intertwined, with Starship's planned launch capacity enabling cheaper Starlink launches, and Starlink's profits financing Starship's development costs. In deficit from its inception until the end of 2022, Starlink was first reported to be cash flow positive in the first quarter of 2023, though Elon Musk said that Starlink had only reached "break-even cashflow" in 2023. In December 2023, the FCC issued a final denial of a $885 million Starlink RDOF subsidy because of Starlink's "continuing inability to successfully launch on the Starship rocket".

=== Artemis Program ===
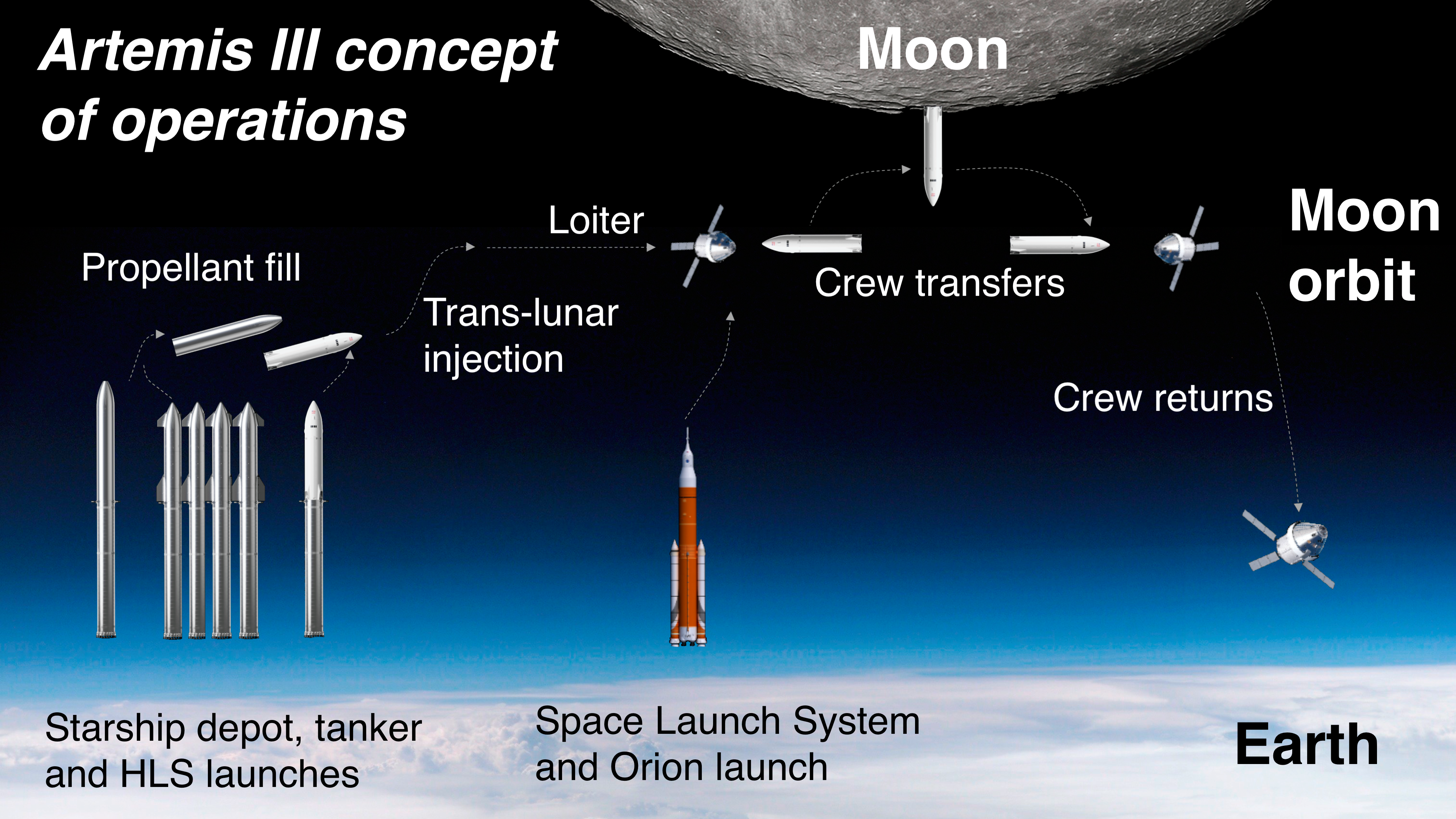
Artemis III launch profile of a human landing on the Moon, involving Starship HLS, Starship tanker variants, and Orion spacecraft

Starship HLS was initially chosen by NASA as the sole lunar Human Landing System for the planned Artemis III and Artemis IV. In February 2026, NASA restructured the program: Artemis III became a mid-2027 crewed test in low Earth orbit, in which Orion docks with Starship and/or Blue Origin's lander, and Artemis IV became the first landing attempt, targeted for 2028. Starship HLS is to be launched into a low Earth orbit, and refueled by multiple Starship tanker spacecraft. Once fueled, it would perform a trans lunar injection burn and enter a near-rectilinear halo orbit around the Moon, with a perilune of 1,500 km (930 mi) occurring over the north pole and an apolune of 70,000 km (43,000 mi) occurring over the south pole. The Orion spacecraft would then dock with Starship HLS and two of its four crew would transfer into Starship HLS. Starship HLS would then use its engines to make a powered descent and land near the lunar south pole. After the crew performs the surface portion of its mission, the HLS would ascend with the crew. The crew would then transfer into the Orion spacecraft and return to Earth.

=== Astronomy ===
Astronomers have called to consider Starship's larger mass to orbit and wider cargo bay for proposed space telescopes such as LUVOIR, and to develop larger telescopes to take advantage of these capabilities. Starship's 9 m (30 ft) fairing width could hold an 8 m (26 ft) wide space telescope mirror in a single piece, alleviating the need for complex unfolding such as that of the JWST's 6.5 m (21 ft) mirror, which added cost and delays.

Regarding larger mass to orbit limits, the Ariane 5 imposed a ~6,500 kg limit on the telescope's weight. Starship's low launch cost could also allow probes to use heavier, more common, less expensive materials, such as glass instead of beryllium for large telescope mirrors. With a 5 t (11,000 lb) mirror built using similar methods to the Hubble Space Telescope's mirror, the JWST would represent only 10% of the mass deliverable by a (refueled) Starship to the Sun–Earth L2 point, and therefore minimizing the weight of the telescope would not have been a dominant design consideration.

The National Academies of Science's 2020 survey recommended the Habitable Worlds Observatory (HWO); the space observatory, requiring a super heavy lift launch vehicle, will search for signs of life on exoplanets. The HWO's team hopes for the success of big launchers due to their critical importance to the HWO's mission. Lee Feinberg, NASA HWO lead architect and JWST manager, stays in communication with SpaceX to track Starship's progress and has visited them in 2024 for that purpose. The NASA Habitable Worlds Observatory will have a 6–8 meter mirror for now, but its design should be flexible to leverage launchers with potentially double the mass and volume by the time it launches in the 2040s. Former NASA JPL architect Casey Handmer believes the HWO to be far too conservative compared to what is possible with Starship. Handmer argues that Starship enables telescopes to scale up to the point of surface-level exoplanet imaging, perhaps big enough to detect seasonal migration patterns.

=== Rocket cargo ===
In January 2022, SpaceX was awarded a $102 million five-year contract to develop the Rocket Cargo program for the United States Space Force. The five-year contract is intended to "determine exactly what a rocket can achieve when used for cargo transport", and will see the Air Force Research Laboratory collect data during commercial launches of Starship. The contract includes an eventual demonstration mission with the launch and landing of a cargo-laden Starship in a point-to-point flight.

The Department of Defense has planned a test with Starship as part of its program to demonstrate the ability to rapidly deploy up to 100 tons of cargo and supplies, a capability it calls point-to-point delivery (P2PD). The test was envisioned to take place in FY25 or FY26.

=== Mars Sample Return ===
In 2024, the NASA-ESA Mars Sample Return project, one of NASA's highest priority flagship projects, suffered a setback when an independent review board assessing the project's feasibility concluded that the project could not be completed under its mission profile. In April 2024, the Administrator of NASA then announced that a new mission profile was needed for the project and that NASA would turn to industry for proposals, with responses due in fall 2024, and a high emphasis on lower total cost and lower risk. Starship was proposed by some space journalists as a leading candidate to serve as a central component of the new mission profile architecture.

=== Transportation ===
SpaceX has proposed using Starship for point-to-point flights (called "Earth to Earth" flights by SpaceX), traveling anywhere on Earth in under an hour. Musk stated that SpaceX would complete hundreds of cargo flights before launching with human passengers.

=== Space colonization ===
According to SpaceX, the design of Starship is driven by its requirement to be able to land crews on Mars, though SpaceX has not published technical plans or designs about Starship's life support systems, radiation protection, docking system, or in-orbit refueling system for Mars. The spacecraft would be launched to low Earth orbit and refueled in orbit before heading to Mars. After landing on Mars, the Sabatier reaction could be used to synthesize liquid methane and liquid oxygen, Starship's fuel, in a power-to-gas plant. The plant's raw resources would be Martian water and Martian carbon dioxide. On Earth, similar technologies could be used to make carbon-neutral propellant for the rocket. To date, there has been one proof of concept experiment (MOXIE) demonstrating the extraction of oxygen from Martian carbon dioxide, with George Dvorsky writing for Gizmodo commenting that we are not "remotely close" to turning this "into something practical".

SpaceX and Musk have stated their goal of colonizing Mars to ensure the long-term survival of humanity, with an ambition of having sent one million people to Mars by 2050. In March 2022, he estimated that the first crewed Mars landing could occur in 2029. This timeline has been criticized as unrealistic by Kevin Olsen, a physicist at the University of Oxford, England, who has said that "colony needs to become a factory" to produce air, fuel and water as it is "fundamentally impossible to create a completely closed environment in space", and that the technology to do so is "far, far behind the technology of space flight and habitation construction". Serkan Saydam, a mining engineering professor from the University of New South Wales, Australia, stated that humanity currently lacks the necessary technology to establish a Martian colony, and will likely lack the capacity to establish a Martian city with one million people by 2050.

=== Other missions ===
A future payload is the Superbird-9 communication satellite, which was Starship's first contract for externally made commercial satellites. Another planned payload is the Starlab space station, which Starship expects to launch in a single piece.

In the future, the spacecraft's crewed version could be used for space tourism—for example, for the third flight of the Polaris program.

Research conducted by Project Lyra determined that with refueling in LEO, a Starship could send a spacecraft to ʻOumuamua on a journey taking 20 years. A gravity assist would be required at Jupiter.

== Facilities ==
=== Testing and manufacturing ===
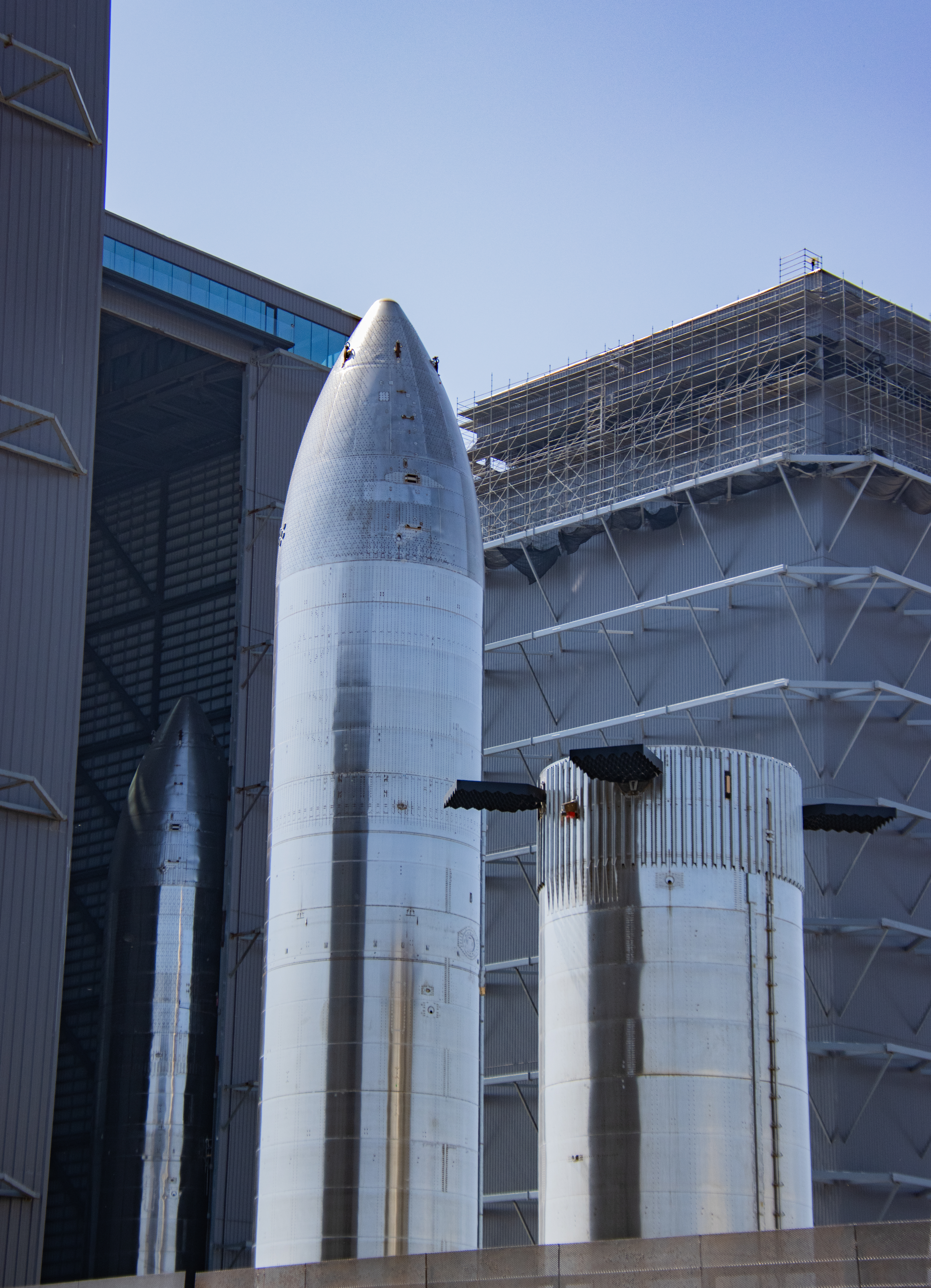
Ship 27, Ship 26 and Booster 10 forward section under construction in Starbase build site, March 2023

Starbase consists of a manufacturing facility and launch site, and is located at Boca Chica, Texas. Both facilities operate 24 hours a day. A maximum of 450 full-time employees may be onsite. The site consists of two launch sites, one payload processing facility, one seven-acre (2.8 ha) solar farm, and other facilities.

Raptor engines are tested at the Rocket Development facility in McGregor, Texas. The facility has two main test stands: one horizontal stand for both engine types and one vertical stand for sea-level-optimized rocket engines. In the future, a nearby factory, which as of September 2021 was under construction, will make the new generation of sea-level Raptors while SpaceX's headquarters in California will continue building the Raptor Vacuum and test new designs.

At Florida, a facility at Cocoa purifies silica for Starship heat-shield tiles, producing a slurry that is then shipped to a facility at Cape Canaveral. In the past, workers constructed the Starship MK2 prototype in competition with Starbase's crews. The Kennedy Space Center, also in Florida, is planned to host other Starship facilities, such as a Starship launch site at Launch Complex 39A and a production facility at Roberts Road. This production facility is being expanded from "Hangar X", the Falcon rocket boosters' storage and maintenance facility. It will include a 30,000 m^{2} (320,000 ft^{2}) building, loading dock, and a place for constructing integration tower sections. Adjacent to the Kennedy Space Center will be an additional launch site at Cape Canaveral Space Launch Complex 37, likely to service missions for the complex owner, the United States Space Force.

=== Launch sites ===
==== Starbase ====
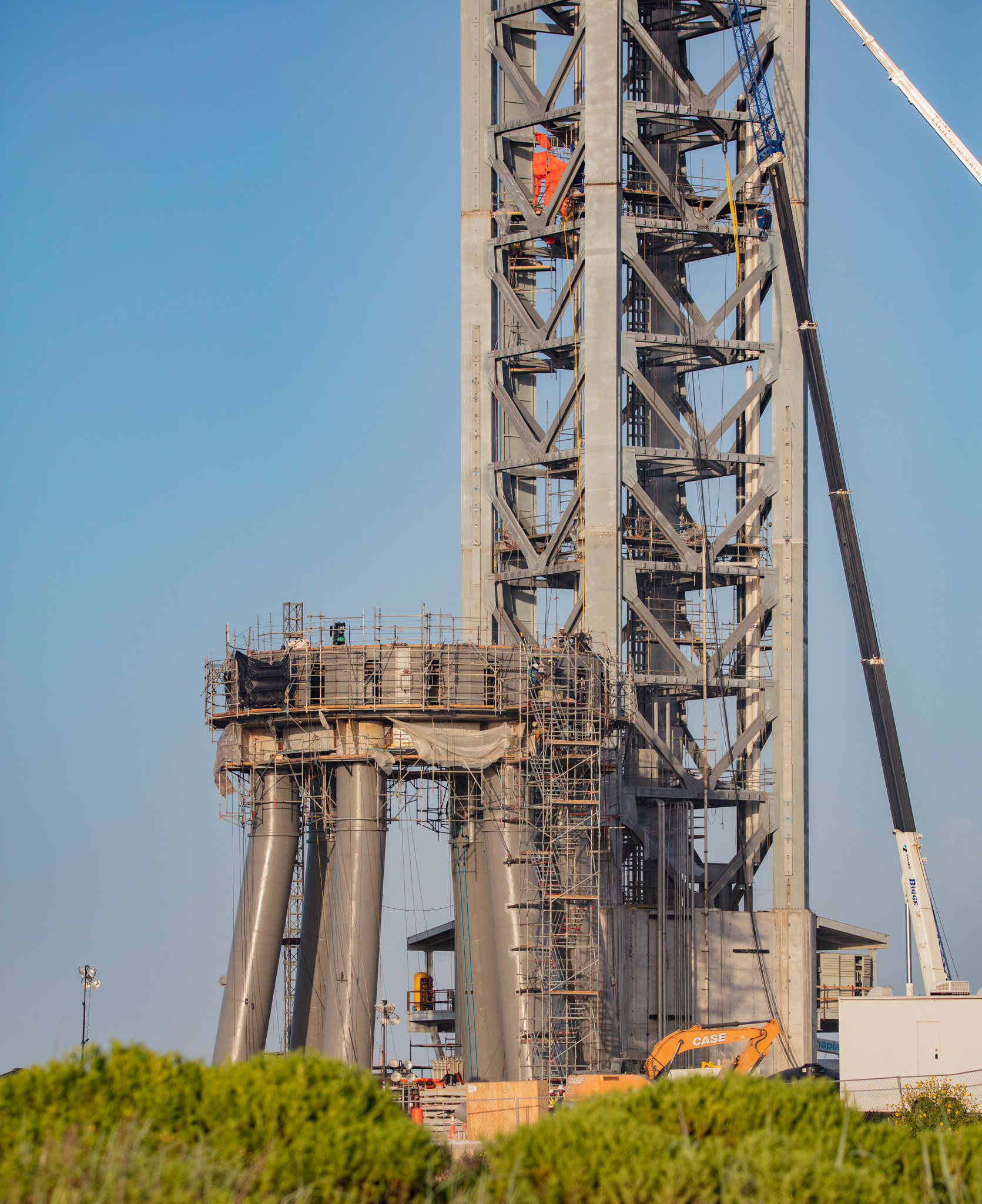
Orbital launch mount A under construction in Starbase, August 2021

Starbase hosts two launch sites, named Pad A and Pad B or Orbital Launch Pads 1 and 2 (OLP-1 and 2). A launch site at Starbase has large facilities, such as a tank farm, an orbital launch mount, and an integration tower. Smaller facilities are present at the launch site: tanks surrounding the area containing methane, oxygen, nitrogen, helium, hydraulic fluid, etc.; subcoolers near the tank farm cool propellant using liquid nitrogen; and various pipes are installed at large facilities. Each tank farm consists of eight tanks, enough to support one orbital launch. The launch mount on Pad A has a water-powered flame diverter, 20 clamps holding the booster, and a quick disconnect mount providing liquid fuel and electricity to the Super Heavy booster before it lifts off.

The integration tower or launch tower consists of steel truss sections, a lightning rod on top, and a pair of mechanical arms that can lift, catch and recover the booster. The decision to catch the booster with the arms was made to reduce the rocket's mass and mechanical complexity by removing the need for landing legs, as well as enabling more rapid reuse by placing the rocket directly back on the launchpad. The mechanical arms are attached to a carriage and controlled by a pulley at the top of the tower. The pulley is linked to a winch and spool at the base of the tower using a cable. Using the winch and the carriage, the mechanical arms can move vertically, with support from bearings attached at the sides of the carriage. A linear hydraulic actuator moves the arms horizontally. On top of the arms are tracks, which are used to position the booster or spacecraft. The tower is mounted with a quick disconnect arm extending to and contracting from the Starship spacecraft; its functions are similar to the quick disconnect mount that powers the booster.

==== Florida ====
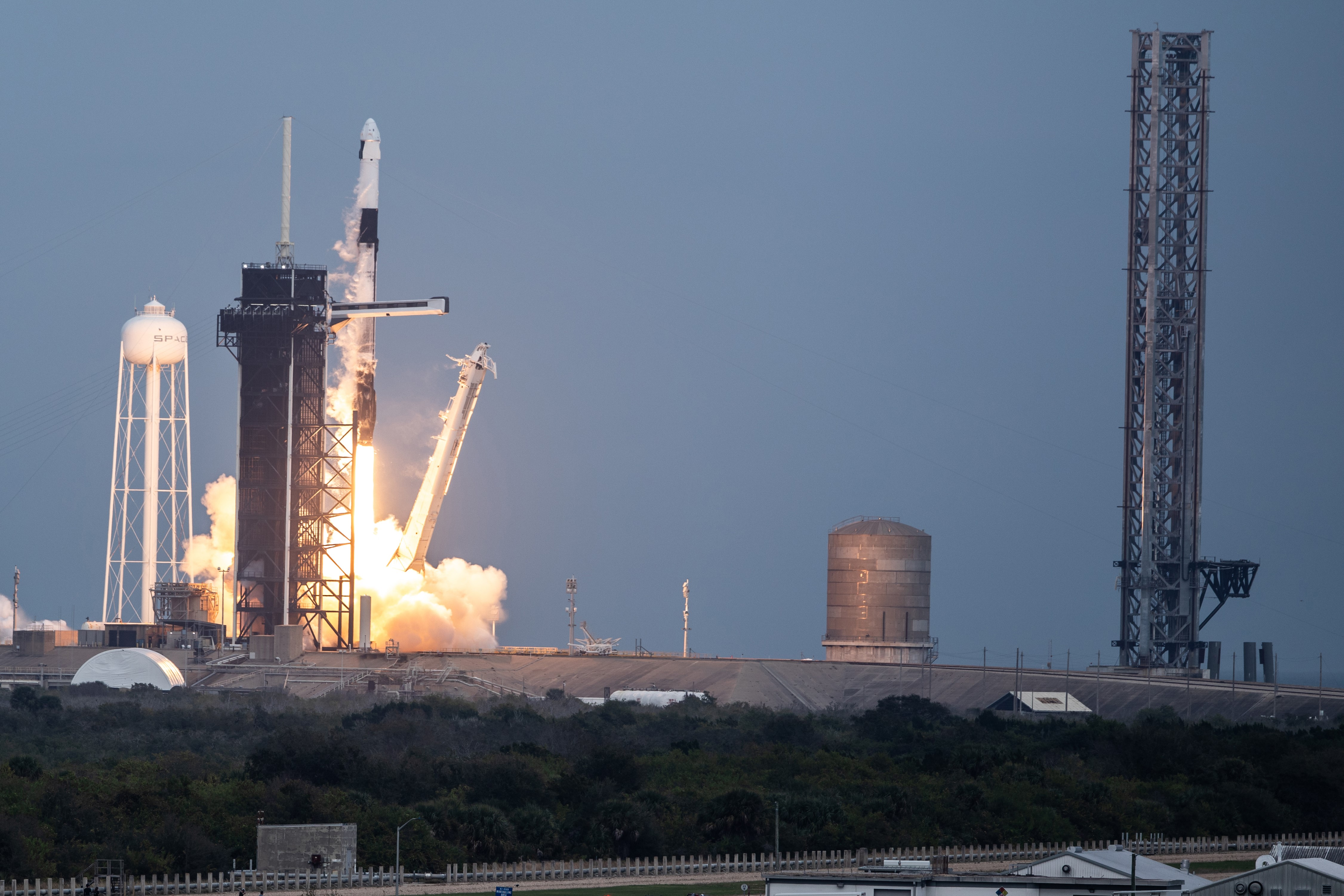
Starship launch tower construction can be seen (right) at LC-39A in January 2024 as Falcon 9 launches continue to take place

SpaceX has been constructing a Starship launch pad at Kennedy Space Center Launch Complex 39A (LC-39A) since 2021. The site was leased to the company in 2014 and is used to launch Falcon 9 rockets. A Finding of No Significant Impact was issued by SpaceX's environmental impact statement (EIS), with NASA as the lead agency, earlier in September 2019 for the launch pad site. In 2024, the Federal Aviation Administration began the process of preparing an EIS evaluating the potential impacts of the new infrastructure and a higher launch cadence of up to 44 per year at LC-39A.

In June 2024, Blue Origin and United Launch Alliance (ULA) provided comments as part of the EIS process, both objecting to the impact that Starship launch operations may have on their own activities at the site. Blue Origin suggested several mitigations, including allowing other operators to object to a Starship launch that would conflict with one of its own, limiting Starship operations to particular times, or expanding the number of launchpads in the area to reduce the impact of conflicting launches. ULA suggested regulators prevent Starship from launching in Florida altogether because a fully fueled Starship would require an evacuation zone so large that it would prevent other operators from using their facilities, and the noise generated by repetitive launches could be injurious to those who live or work nearby. Elon Musk suggested that the two companies' comments were disingenuous and that their true motivation was to impede SpaceX's progress by lawfare.

The company has also proposed building another Starship launch pad at the nearby Cape Canaveral Space Launch Complex 37 (SLC-37) which became vacant in 2024 after the retirement of the Delta IV rocket. That year, the United States Space Force began the process of preparing an EIS evaluating the potential impacts of new infrastructure and a launch cadence of up to 76 times per year at SLC-37. SpaceX and NASA have also worked on assessing LC-49 to the north of 39A. The Kennedy Space Center's Master Plan One has stated that LC-49 could avoid overflight issues with pad 39B and minimize conflict with the Canaveral National Seashore. As of January 18, 2024, NASA did not have activities underway at LC-49.

Both EIS processes must be complete before SpaceX will be cleared to launch Starship from Florida, which likely will not occur until late 2025. The Playalinda Beach has been closed by KSC Police and the National Park Service for many launches from 39A and 39B. The towers and mechanical arms at the sites should be similar to the ones at Starbase.

== Responses to Starship development ==
In order to compete with SpaceX and close their technological gap with the company, the China Aerospace Science and Tech Corp and other aerospace actors in China have reportedly been working on their own equivalent of Starship—the Long March 9 super-heavy lift rocket, which is also designed to eventually be fully reusable. In 2021, the China Academy of Launch Vehicle Technology (CALT) showed a rendered video of a rocket noted to be "strikingly" similar to Starship in appearance and function. In a 2022 event organized by the International Astronautical Federation and the Chinese Society of Astronautics, the CALT communicated performing research on a crewed launch vehicle powered by LOX-methane propellant, with a second stage that was very similar to Starship's.

SpaceNews noted that the Chinese start-up Space Epoch and engine maker Jiuzhou Yunjian were developing a smaller Starship-like rocket with a methane-LOX engine similar to Raptor, stainless steel tanks, and an iterative design. Starship's reusability and stainless-steel construction might also have inspired Project Jarvis, a reusable upper stage for Blue Origin's New Glenn heavy-lift launch vehicle intended to replace New Glenn's expendable upper stage in the future.

In 2021, members of the U.S. Congress voiced concerns about the U.S. FAA's response to SpaceX's launch license violations following the explosion of SN8, calling on the FAA to "resist any potential undue influence on launch safety decision-making". In 2023, prior to Starship's second test flight, SpaceX's vice president and ex-NASA engineer Bill Gerstenmaier made statements at the U.S. Senate on the importance of innovation in light of "strategic competition from state actors like China". He said SpaceX was under a contract with NASA to use Starship to land American astronauts on the Moon before China does, and that the Starship test flights campaign was being held up by "regulatory headwinds and unnecessary bureaucracy" unrelated to public safety.

Following the second flight test of Starship, the U.S. Government Accountability Office (GAO) made recommendations to the U.S. FAA to "improve its mishap investigation process", finding that historically they have allowed the launch operator to conduct their investigation with the FAA supervising. Several environmental groups have filed lawsuits against the FAA and SpaceX, claiming that environmental reviews were bypassed due to Musk's political and financial influence.

== See also ==
- Comparison of orbital launch systems
- Comparison of orbital launcher families
- SpaceX reusable launch system development program
