= Earth orbit =

Earth orbit may refer to:

- Earth's orbit, the orbit of the Earth around the Sun
- Geocentric orbit, an orbit around the Earth
- Geostationary orbit
- Geosynchronous orbit
- Low Earth orbit
- Medium Earth orbit
- High Earth orbit

== See also ==
- Earth Orbiter 1, a shuttle simulator
