= Bret Johnsen =

American business executive (born 1969)

- Born: Bret Johnsen; 1969 (age 56–57)
- Education: University of Southern California (B.A.); San Diego State University (M.S.)
- Occupation: Business executive
- Employer: SpaceX (2011–present)
- Title: Chief financial officer of SpaceX
- Spouse: Catherine Johnsen
- Children: 2

Bret Johnsen (born 1969) is an American business executive who has been the chief financial officer of SpaceX since 2011.

== Early life and education ==
Johnsen is a native of Southern California. He earned a bachelor's degree in accounting from the University of Southern California and a master's degree in finance from San Diego State University.

== Career ==
=== Early career ===
Johnsen began his career in junior finance roles at Qualcomm and at the accounting firm Coopers & Lybrand. In the late 1990s, he was corporate controller at Classified Ventures, a joint venture of newspaper publishers including McClatchy and Gannett that operated the websites Cars.com and Apartments.com. In 1999, he joined the semiconductor company Broadcom, where he eventually rose to the position of corporate controller.

In 2008, at the onset of the global financial crisis, Johnsen was appointed chief financial officer of Mindspeed Technologies. He initiated a restructuring programme that included layoffs, the renegotiation of debt and the sale of patents, and subsequently rebuilt the company's share price through investor relations activity and outreach to institutional investors.

=== SpaceX (2011–present) ===
Johnsen joined SpaceX in 2011, when the company was valued at US$1 billion. According to Johnsen, when a company recruiter first contacted him, he initially believed SpaceX to be a self-storage business. During his tenure, Johnsen oversaw a series of tender offers that enabled SpaceX employees to sell portions of their shareholdings, conducted at intervals of roughly six months, an unusually high frequency for a private company.

In January 2026, Johnsen commenced the process of selecting investment banks for the SpaceX IPO, ultimately assembling a syndicate of 23 institutions. He appointed Goldman Sachs and Morgan Stanley as senior book-running managers, with Goldman Sachs and Morgan Stanley sharing the lead left role and Morgan Stanley overseeing early trading; Citibank was tasked with coordinating international banks including Barclays and UBS in the sale of shares in their home markets.

In February 2026, Following SpaceX's acquisition of xAI at a US$250 billion valuation, Johnsen led a cost-reduction effort at the artificial intelligence subsidiary. He and a small team of finance staff and investors visited xAI's data centres in Memphis shortly after the transaction closed; within weeks, xAI's own CFO had departed, layoffs had been initiated, and SpaceX had begun negotiations to lease much of xAI's computing capacity to Anthropic.

In June 2026, Johnsen became a billionaire while working at SpaceX, after the IPO of SpaceX, his wealth was more readily available for valuation.

== Personal life ==
Johnsen is married to Catherine Johnsen; the couple have two children, Delaney and Kenton, both of whom have interned at SpaceX. The family own homes in Rancho Palos Verdes and Manhattan Beach, and Johnsen co-owns a private aircraft with SpaceX president Gwynne Shotwell. He hosts several annual social events in Orange County, including gatherings at the Del Mar racetrack and at the Culver Hotel in Los Angeles.

Johnsen is a donor to the Republican Party and has contributed to the campaigns of United States senators Lindsey Graham and John Cornyn, as well as to SpaceX's political action committee.
