= SN9 =

SN9 may refer to:

- S9 (ZVV), an overnight service line on the Zürich transportation networt
- SN9, a high-altitude prototype of the SpaceX Starship program. It was destroyed during a test flight.
