= Flight 16 =

Flight 16 may refer to:

- National Airlines Flight 16, a Lockheed 18-50 Lodestar that crashed on 5 October 1945 in Florida, U.S.
- LOT Polish Airlines Flight 16, a Boeing 767-300ER that belly-landed on 1 November 2011 in Warsaw, Poland
- Flight 16 (band), an English rock band from Croydon, England
- Starship flight 16, the planned 16th launch of the SpaceX Starship launch system
