= HQR =

HQR or Hqr may refer to:

- Handling Qualities Rating, metric for pilots used in the Cooper–Harper rating scale
- Classical HQR, subchannel of the WHQR radio station, United States
- Hqr., abbreviation for Haloquadratum, genus of archaea
