= Flying qualities =

Flying qualities, or handling qualities are characteristics of an aircraft which measure or describe how easily and precisely a pilot can control it in flight, and how the aircraft responds to pilot input. Among these attributes are the degrees and ways in which the aircraft is stable in flight.

Flying qualities of aircraft are evaluated by flight testing, along with other attributes: the aircraft's performance (capabilities) and systems.

== Relation to stability ==
Stability is defined when the aircraft is "in trim"; that is, there are no unbalanced forces or moments acting on the vehicle to cause it to deviate from steady flight. If the vehicle is then disturbed, stability refers to the tendency of the vehicle to return to the trimmed condition. If the vehicle initially tends to return to a trimmed condition, it is said to be statically stable. If it continues to approach the trimmed condition without overshooting, the motion is called a subsidence. If the motion causes the vehicle to overshoot the trimmed condition, it may oscillate back and forth. If this oscillation damps out, the motion is called a damped oscillation and the vehicle is said to be dynamically stable. On the other hand, if the motion increases in amplitude, the vehicle is said to be dynamically unstable.

The standard theory of stability of airplanes was worked out by G. H. Bryan in 1904. At the time, Bryan had not heard of the Wright brothers' first flight. Because of the complication of the theory and the tedious computations required to use it, it was rarely applied by airplane designers. Pilotless airplanes had to be dynamically stable to fly successfully. The 1903 airplane flown by the Wright brothers, was not intrinsically stable, drawing instead from the bicycle's dependence on a pilot's control. Designers in the early years of airplanes developed a few planes that had satisfactory flying qualities. Many other airplanes had poor flying qualities, which sometimes resulted in crashes.

Handling qualities are those characteristics of a flight vehicle that govern the ease and precision with which a pilot is able to perform a flying task. This includes the human-machine interface. The way in which particular vehicle factors affect flying qualities has been studied in aircraft for decades, and reference standards for the flying qualities of both fixed-wing aircraft and rotary-wing aircraft have been developed and are now in common use. These standards define a subset of the dynamics and control design space that provides good handling qualities for a given vehicle type and flying task.

== Historical development ==
Bryan showed that the stability characteristics of airplanes could be separated into longitudinal and lateral groups with the corresponding motions called modes of motion. These modes of motion were either aperiodic, which means that the airplane steadily approaches or diverges from a trimmed condition, or oscillatory, which means that the airplane oscillates about the trim condition. The longitudinal modes of a statically stable airplane following a disturbance were shown to consist of a long-period oscillation called the phugoid oscillation, usually with a period in seconds about one-quarter of the airspeed in miles per hour and a short-period oscillation with a period of only a few seconds. The lateral motion had three modes of motion: an aperiodic mode called the spiral mode that could be a divergence or subsidence, a heavily damped aperiodic mode called the roll subsidence, and a short-period oscillation, usually poorly damped, called the Dutch roll mode.

Some early airplane designers attempted to make airplanes that were dynamically stable, but it was found that the requirements for stability conflicted with those for satisfactory flying qualities. Meanwhile, no information was available to guide the designer as to just what characteristics should be incorporated to provide satisfactory flying qualities.

By the 1930s, there was a general feeling that airplanes should be dynamically stable, but some aeronautical engineers were starting to recognize the conflict between the requirements for stability and flying qualities. To resolve this question, Edward Warner, who was working as a consultant to the Douglas Aircraft Company on the design of the DC-4, a large four-engine transport airplane, made the first effort in the United States to write a set of requirements for satisfactory flying qualities. Dr. Warner, a member of the main committee of the NACA, also requested that a flight study be made to determine the flying qualities of an airplane along the lines of the suggested requirements. This study was conducted by Hartley A. Soulé of Langley. Soulé's report, Preliminary Investigation of the Flying Qualities of Airplanes, showed several areas in which the suggested requirements needed revision and showed the need for more research on other types of airplanes. As a result, a program was started by Robert R. Gilruth with Melvin N. Gough as the chief test pilot.

== Evaluation of flying qualities ==
The technique for the study of flying qualities requirements used by Gilruth was first to install instruments to record relevant quantities such as control positions and forces, airplane angular velocities, linear accelerations, airspeed, and altitude. Then a program of specified flight conditions and maneuvers was flown by an experienced test pilot. After the flight, data were transcribed from the records and the results were correlated with pilot opinion. This approach would be considered routine today, but it was a notable original contribution by Gilruth that took advantage of the flight recording instruments already available at Langley and the variety of airplanes available for tests under comparable conditions.

An important quantity in flying qualities measurements in turns or pull-ups is the variation of control force on the control stick or wheel with the value of acceleration normal to the flight direction expressed in g units. This quantity is usually called the force per g.

== Relation to spacecraft ==
A new generation of spacecraft now under development by NASA to replace the Space Shuttle and return astronauts to the Moon will have a manual control capability for several mission tasks, and the ease and precision with which pilots can execute these tasks will have an important effect on performance, mission risk and training costs. No reference standards currently exist for flying qualities of piloted spacecraft.

== See also ==
- Flight test
- Cooper-Harper rating scale
- Pilot-induced oscillation
- Longitudinal static stability
- Flight envelope
