= List of Starship vehicles =

Since April 2023, Starship has been launched 15 times, with 10 successes and 5 failures. The vehicle Starship when combined with the Super Heavy booster, also named Starship, has been developed with the intention of lowering launch costs using full reusability and economies of scale. SpaceX aims to achieve this by reusing both rocket stages, increasing payload mass to orbit, increasing launch frequency, creating a mass-manufacturing pipeline and adapting it to a wide range of space missions. Starship is the latest project in SpaceX's reusable launch system development program and plan to colonize Mars.

The catch of Ship 42 on Starship Flight 15

There are three versions of Starship: Block 1 (also known as Version 1 or V1), Block 2, and Block 3; the proposed variants include a depot, Starship HLS, and Starship Crew. Block 2 Starships are designed to be compatible with Block 1 and with future Block 2 boosters. As of November 2026, all Block 1 and Block 2 vehicles have been retired, and four Block 3 ships have flown: S39, S40, S41 and S42. The Starship spacecraft was caught by the launch tower for the first time on Starship flight 15 with S42. The Starship spacecraft is intended to be reusable, and to be recovered via large arms on the tower capable of catching the descending vehicle.

== Development ==
Serial number	Type	Launches	Launch date	Flight Number (Note: Entries with mint colored background denote flights using new ships.)	Turnaround time	Payload	Launch (pad)	Landing (location)	Status
Starhopper	—N/a	4	April 3, 2019	—	—N/a	—N/a	Success (SLS)	Success (SLS)	Repurposed
Starhopper	—N/a	4	April 5, 2019	—N/a	2 days	—N/a	Success (SLS)	Success (SLS)	Repurposed
Starhopper	—N/a	4	July 25, 2019	Hop 1	111 days	—N/a	Success (SLS)	Success (SLS)	Repurposed
Starhopper	—N/a	4	August 27, 2019	Hop 2	33 days	—N/a	Success (SLS)	Success (SLS)	Repurposed
Mk1	—N/a	0	—N/a	—	—N/a	—N/a	—N/a	—N/a	Destroyed
Mk3/SN1	—N/a	0	—N/a	—	—N/a	—N/a	—N/a	—N/a	Destroyed
SN3	—N/a	0	—N/a	—	—N/a	—N/a	—N/a	—N/a	Destroyed
SN4	—N/a	0	—N/a	—	—N/a	—N/a	—N/a	—N/a	Destroyed
SN5	—N/a	1	August 4, 2020	Hop 3	—N/a	—N/a	Success (SLS)	Success (SLS)	Scrapped
SN6	—N/a	1	September 3, 2020	Hop 4	—N/a	—N/a	Success (SLS)	Success (SLS)	Scrapped
SN8	—N/a	1	December 9, 2020	High-Altitude flight test 1	—N/a	—N/a	Success (SLS)	Failure (SLS)	Destroyed
SN9	—N/a	1	February 2, 2021	High-Altitude flight test 2	—N/a	—N/a	Success (SLS)	Failure (SLS)	Destroyed
SN10	—N/a	1	March 3, 2021	High-Altitude flight test 3	—N/a	—N/a	Success (SLS)	Partial failure (SLS)	Destroyed
SN11	—N/a	1	March 30, 2021	High-Altitude flight test 4	—N/a	—N/a	Success (SLS)	Failure (SLS)	Destroyed
SN15	—N/a	1	May 5, 2021	High-Altitude flight test 5	—N/a	—N/a	Success (SLS)	Success (SLS)	Scrapped
SN16	—N/a	0	—N/a	—	—N/a	—N/a	—N/a	—N/a	Scrapped
SN20/Ship 20	—N/a	0	—N/a	—	—N/a	—N/a	—N/a	—N/a	Retired
Ship 22	—N/a	0	—N/a	—	—N/a	—N/a	—N/a	—N/a	Scrapped, converted into HLS mockup
Ship 24	Block 1	1	April 20, 2023	Starship flight test 1	—N/a	—N/a	Failure (OLP-1) (Note: The booster failed before stage separation)	Precluded	Destroyed
Ship 25	Block 1	1	November 18, 2023	Starship flight test 2	—N/a	—N/a	Failure (OLP-1)	Precluded	Destroyed
Ship 26	Block 1	0	—N/a	—	—N/a	—N/a	—N/a	—N/a	Scrapped
Ship 27	Block 1	0	—N/a	—	—N/a	—N/a	—N/a	—N/a	Scrapped, converted into test article
Ship 28	Block 1	1	March 14, 2024	Starship flight test 3	—N/a	—N/a	Success (OLP-1)	Failure (ocean)	Destroyed
Ship 29	Block 1	1	June 6, 2024	Starship flight test 4	—N/a	—N/a	Success (OLP-1)	Controlled (ocean)	Expended
Ship 30	Block 1	1	October 13, 2024	Starship flight test 5	—N/a	—N/a	Success (OLP-1)	Controlled (ocean)	Expended
Ship 31	Block 1	1	November 19, 2024	Starship flight test 6	—N/a	Stuffed banana	Success (OLP-1)	Controlled (ocean)	Expended
Ship 32	Block 1	0	—N/a	—	—N/a	—N/a	—N/a	—N/a	Scrapped
Ship 33	Block 2	1	January 16, 2025	Starship flight test 7	—N/a	10 Starlink simulators	Failure (OLP-1)	Precluded	Destroyed
Ship 34	Block 2	1	March 6, 2025	Starship flight test 8	—N/a	4 Starlink simulators	Failure (OLP-1)	Precluded	Destroyed
Ship 35	Block 2	1	May 27, 2025	Starship flight test 9	—N/a	8 Starlink simulators	Failure (OLP-1)	Failure (ocean)	Destroyed
Ship 36	Block 2	0	—N/a	—	—N/a	—N/a	—N/a	—N/a	Destroyed
Ship 37	Block 2	1	August 26, 2025	Starship flight test 10	—N/a	8 Starlink simulators	Success (OLP-1)	Controlled (ocean)	Expended
Ship 38	Block 2	1	October 13, 2025	Starship flight test 11	—N/a	8 Starlink simulators	Success (OLP-1)	Controlled (ocean)	Expended
Ship 39	Block 3	1	May 21, 2026	Starship flight test 12	—N/a	22 Starlink simulators	Success (OLP-2)	Controlled (ocean)	Expended
Ship 40	Block 3	1	July 24, 2026	Starship flight test 13	—N/a	20 Starlink v3 satellites	Success (OLP-2)	Controlled (ocean)	Retired after ocean recovery
Ship 41	Block 3	1	September 28, 2026	Starship flight 14	—N/a	26 Starlink v3 satellites	Success (OLP-2)	Controlled (ocean)	Expended
Ship 42	Block 3	1	November 13, 2026	Starship flight 15	—N/a	26 Starlink v3 satellites	Success (OLP-2)	Success (OLP-2)	Active
Ship 43	Block 3	0	—N/a	Starship flight 16 (planned)	—N/a	—N/a	—N/a	—N/a	Cryo tested, awaiting engine installation
Ship 44	Block 3	0	—N/a	—	—N/a	—N/a	—N/a	—N/a	Stacked, awaiting testing
Ship 45	Block 3	0	—N/a	—	—N/a	—N/a	—N/a	—N/a	Under construction
Ship 46	Block 3	0	—N/a	—	—N/a	—N/a	—N/a	—N/a	Under construction

=== Starhopper ===
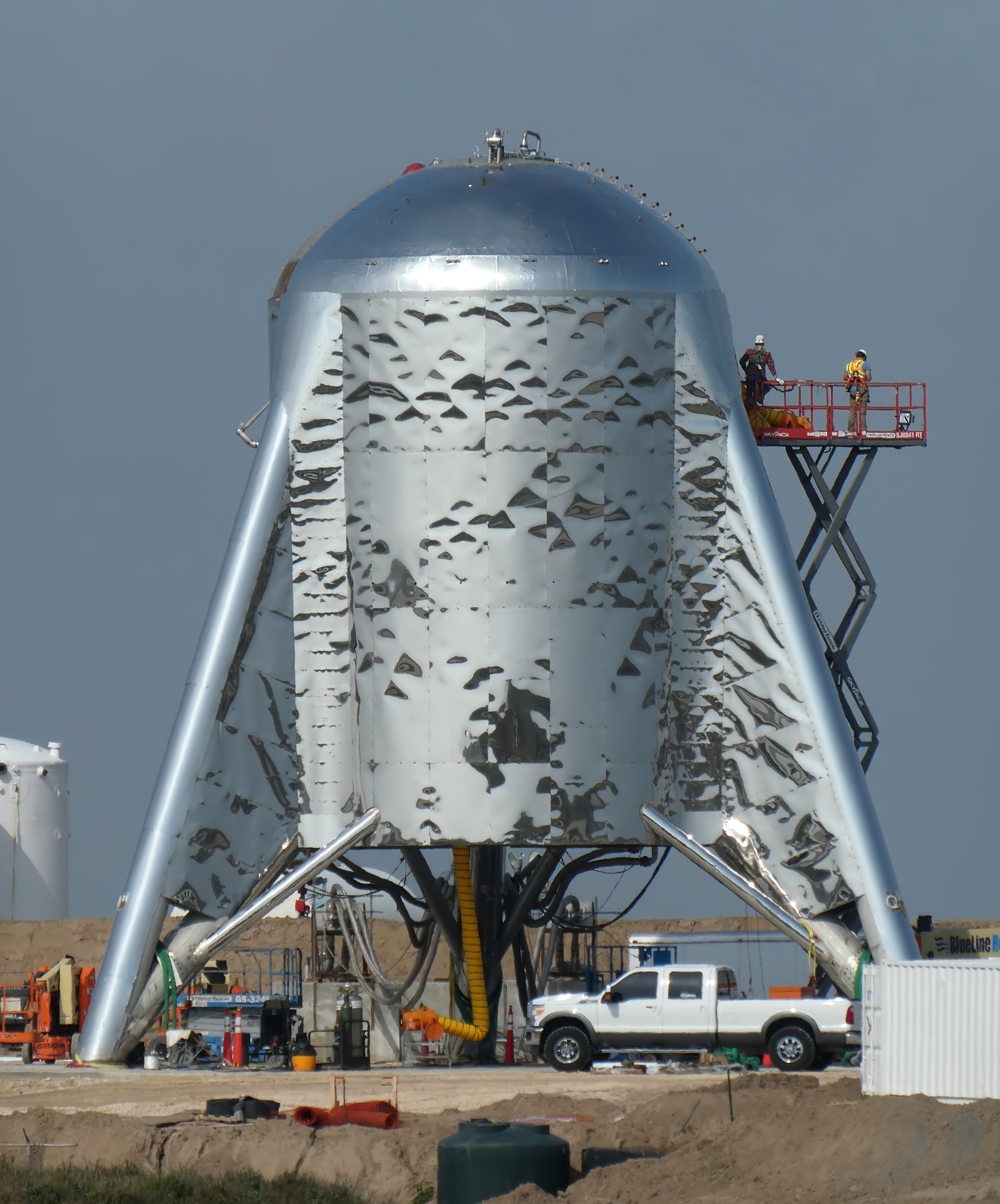
Starhopper in March 2019

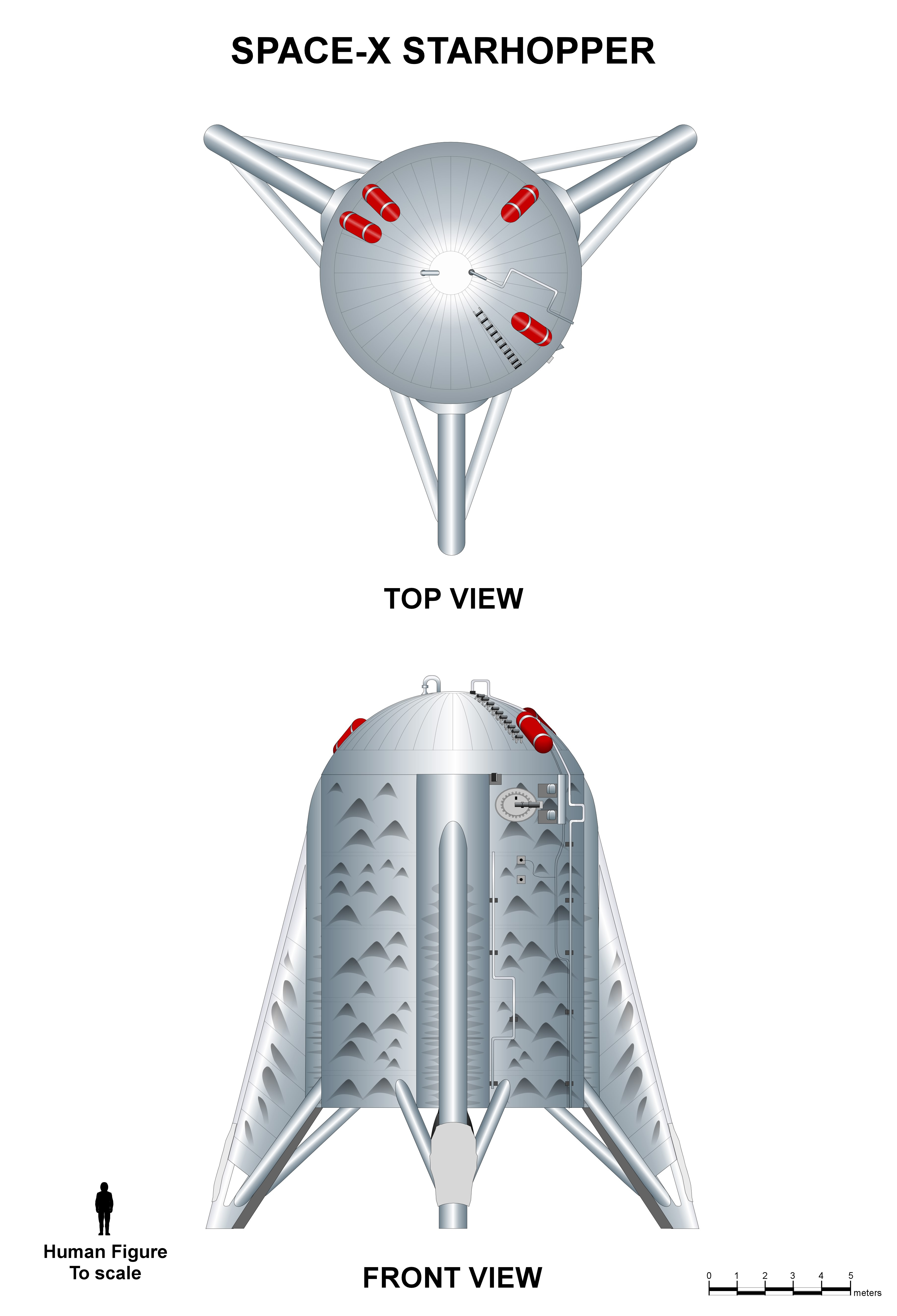
Starhopper configuration as flown in August 2019

Construction on the initial steel test article—Starship Hopper, Hopper, Hoppy, or Starhopper—began at Boca Chica, Texas in 2018. Starhopper had a single engine and was test flown to develop landing and low-altitude/low-velocity control algorithms.

Starhopper used liquid oxygen (LOX) and liquid methane fuel. After it completed its testing campaign, Starhopper was repurposed as a water tank, weather station and equipment mount for cameras, lights, loudspeakers and a radar system.

==== Testing ====
It passed tanking tests, wet dress rehearsals, and pre-burner tests. A storm blew over and damaged Starhopper's nose cone. SpaceX continued testing without one.

It then passed a static fire test, and in a tethered test reached 1 meter altitude. On July 25, 2019, a Starhopper test flight reached about 20 m (66 ft) altitude, followed by an August 27 test that rose to 150 m (490 ft) and landed about 100 m (330 ft) from the launchpad, the Raptor engine's first use in flight.

On September 3, 2024, Starhopper was moved to a parking lot near the launch site.

=== Mark series (Mk1–Mk4) ===
Starship Mk1 in September 2019

SpaceX began building the high-altitude prototype, Mk1 in Texas and Mk2 in Florida, using competing teams that shared progress, insights, and build techniques. The vehicle featured three Raptor methalox engines and was meant to reach an altitude of 5 km (3.1 mi).

Mk1 was 9 m (30 ft) in diameter and about 50 m (160 ft) tall, with an empty mass of 200 t (440,000 lb). It was intended for testing flight and reentry profiles, in pursuit of a suborbital flight. When announced, it had three sea-level Raptor engines, two fins each at the front and back, and a nose cone containing cold-gas reaction control thrusters, with all but the aft fins being removed afterwards.

On November 20, 2019, Mk1 blew apart during a pressure test.

SpaceX began Mk2 in Florida, sharing progress, insights, and build techniques with the Mk1 team in Texas. It was never completed.

The Mk3 prototype began construction in late 2019. In December 2019, Elon Musk redesignated Mk3 as Starship SN1, and predicted that minor design improvements would continue through SN20. SpaceX began stacking SN1 in February 2020 after successful pressurization tests on propellant tank prototypes. SN1 was destroyed during a cryogenic pressurization test on February 28, 2020, due to a design flaw in the lower tank thrust structure.

Mk4 began construction in Florida in October 2019, but was scrapped after a few weeks.

=== Hops (SN3–SN6) ===
==== SN3 and SN4 ====
SN3 was destroyed during testing on April 3, 2020 due to a failure in the testing configuration.

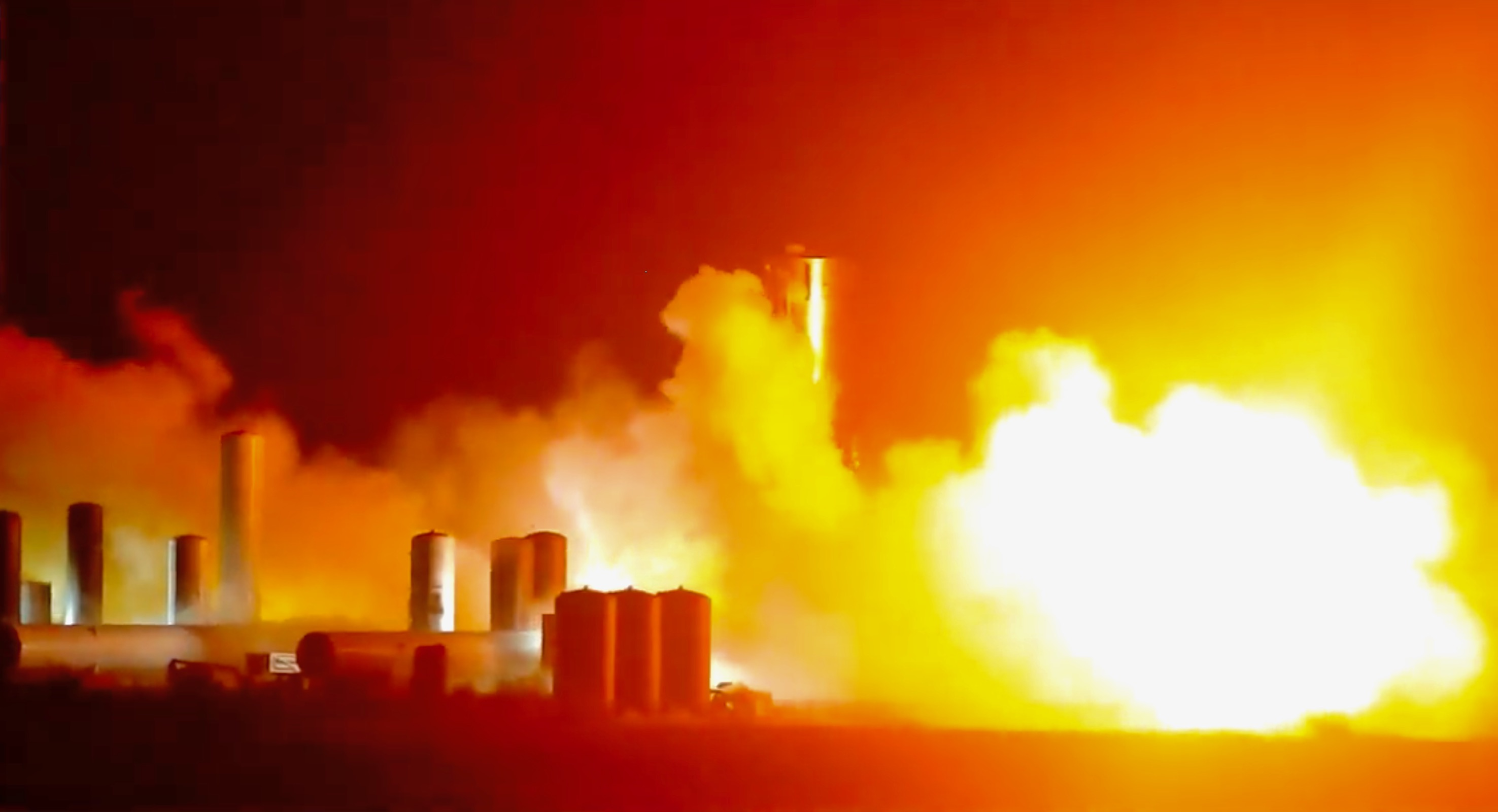
Static fire of SN4

SN4 passed cryogenic pressure testing on April 26 and two static fires on May 5 and 7: one tested the main tanks, while the other tested the fuel header tank. After uninstalling the engine, a new cryogenic pressure test was conducted on May 19. A leak in the methane fuel piping ignited, causing significant damage to the rocket's base, destroying the control wiring. SN4 was destroyed on May 29, due to a failure with the Ground Support Equipment's quick-disconnect function.

==== SN5 and SN6 ====
After a static fire test on July 30, SN5 completed a 150-meter flight (August 4) with engine SN27. SN5 was scrapped in February 2021.

SN6 completed a static fire on August 24, and a 150-meter hop test flight with engine SN29 on September 3. In January 2021, SN6 was scrapped.

=== High-altitude test flights (SN8–S23) ===
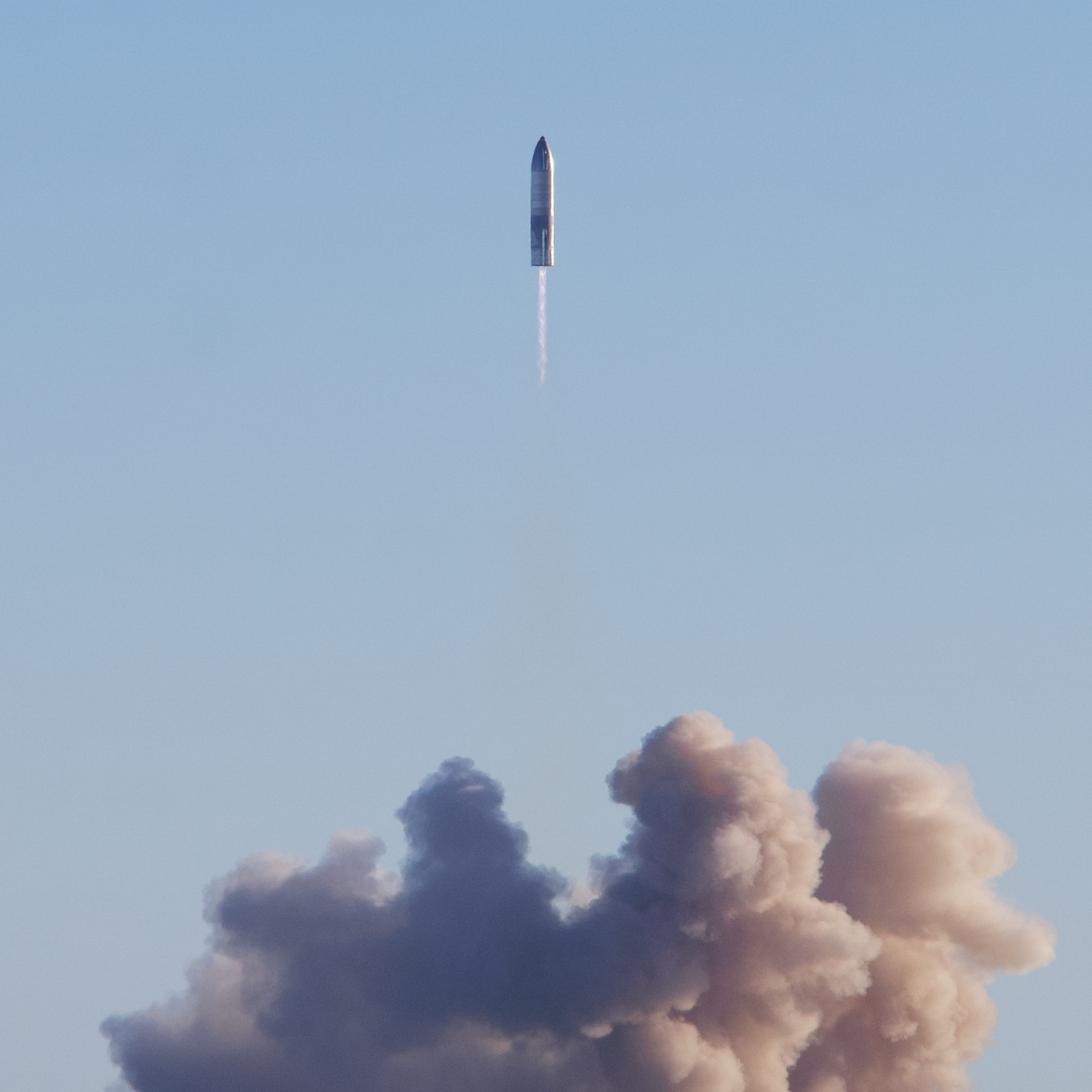
SN8 shortly after taking off during its test flight

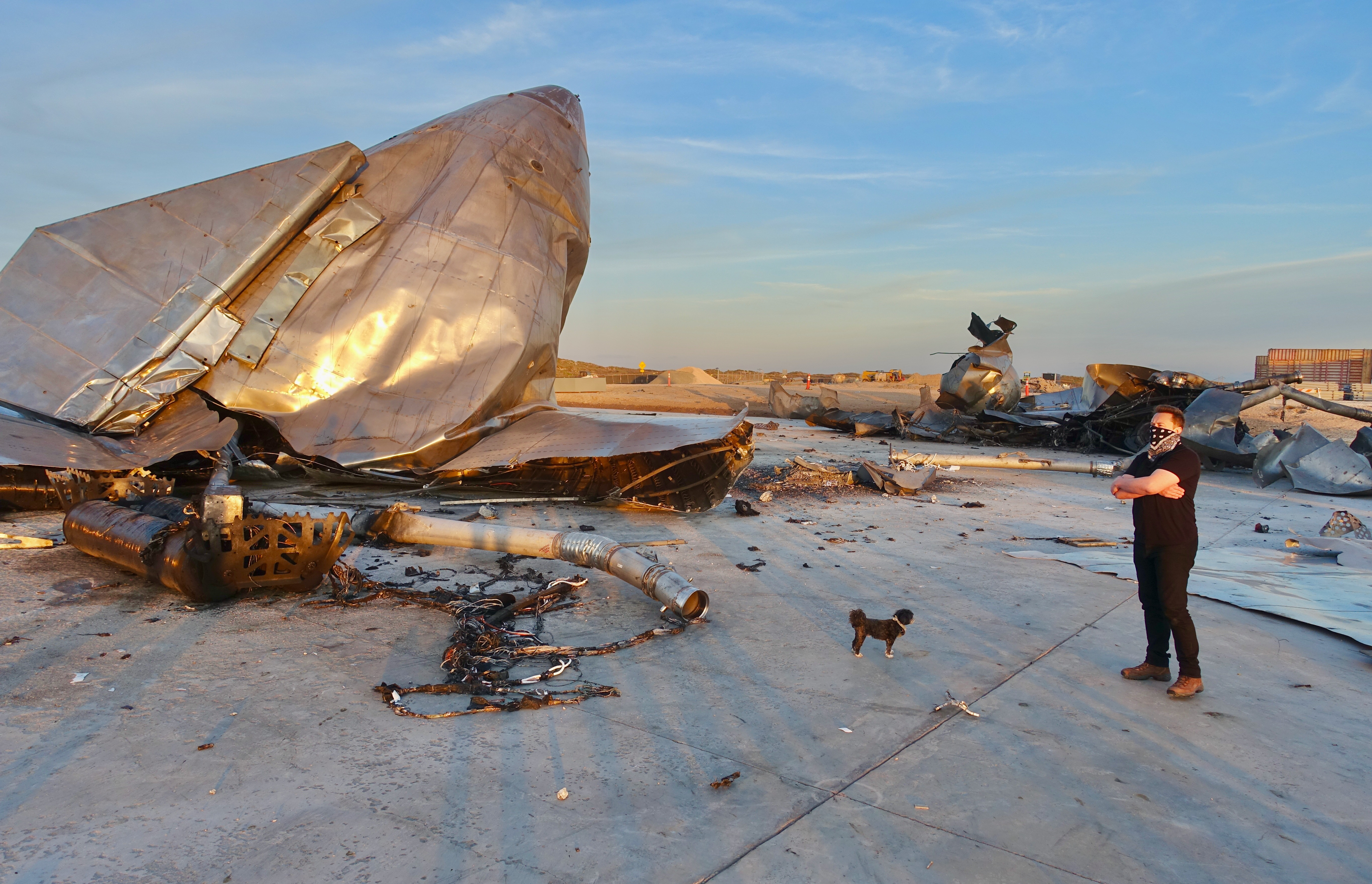
Starship SN8 remains after it crashed to the ground

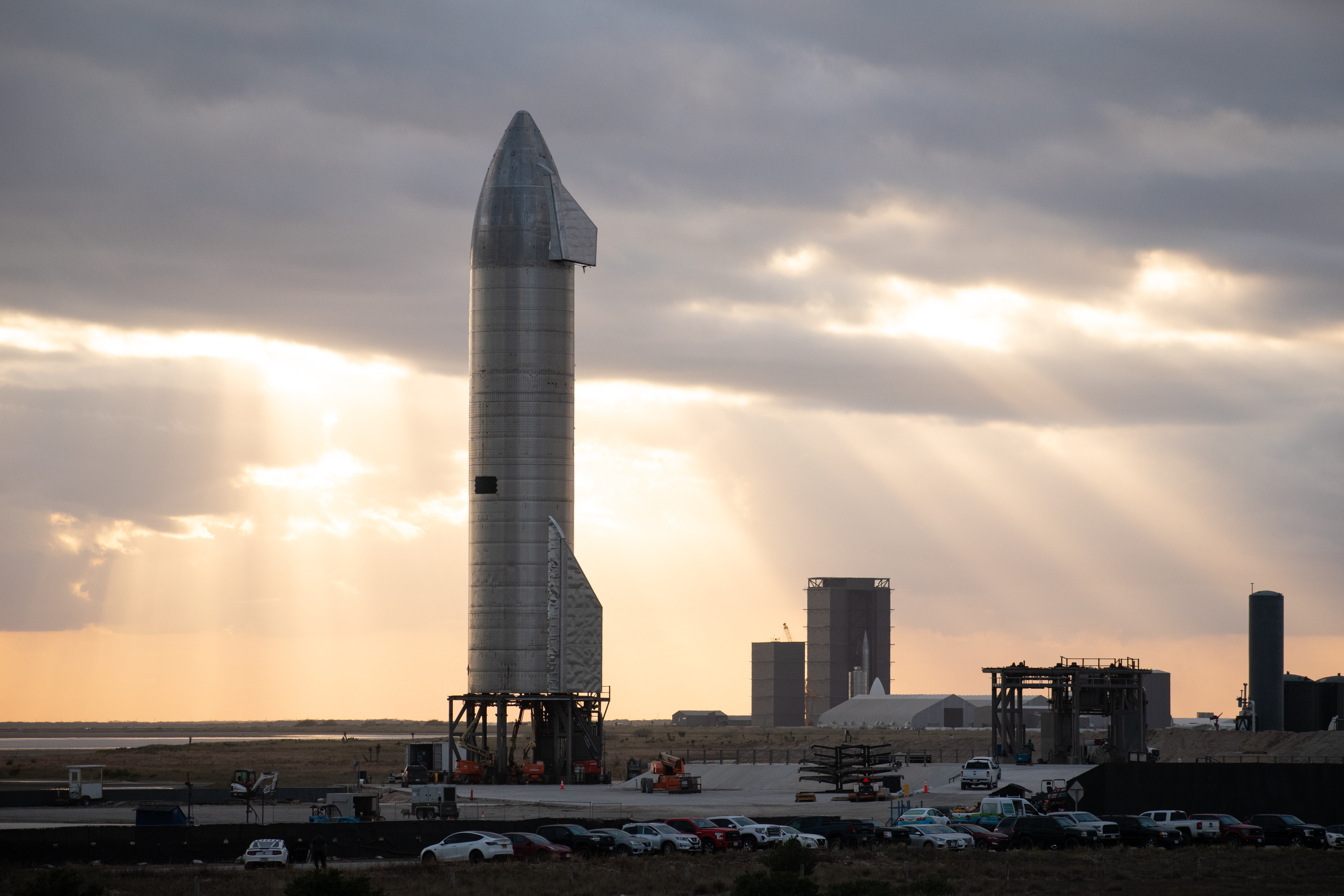
SN9 on Suborbital Pad B, with the production facility in the background

==== SN8 and SN9 ====
SN8 was planned to be built out of 304L stainless steel, although some parts may have used 301L steel. In late October and November, SN8 underwent four static fires. During the third test, on November 12, 2020, debris from the pad caused the vehicle to lose pneumatics. Launch took place on December 9. Launch, ascent, reorientation, and controlled descent were successful, but low pressure in the methane header tank kept the engines from producing enough thrust for the landing burn, destroying SN8 on impact.

On December 11, 2020, the stand beneath SN9 failed, causing the vehicle to tip and contact the walls inside the High Bay assembly building. SN9 then required a replacement forward flap. SN9 conducted 6 static fires in January 2021, including three static fires in one day. After these tests, two engines had to be replaced. After struggling to gain U.S. Federal Aviation Administration (FAA) permission, SN9 conducted a 10 km (6.2 mi) flight test on February 2. Ascent, engine cutoffs, reorientation and controlled descent were stable, but one engine's oxygen pre-burner failed, sending SN9 crashing into the landing pad. The landing pad was then reinforced with an additional layer of concrete. After the SN9 failure, all three engines were used to perform the belly flop landing sequence. This offered a failsafe should one fail to ignite.

==== SN10–SN14 ====
SN10 underwent a cryogenic proof test on February 8, 2021, followed by a static fire on February 23. After an engine swap, another static fire was conducted on February 25.

Two launch attempts were conducted on March 3. The first attempt was automatically aborted after one engine produced too much thrust while throttling up. After a 3-hour delay to increase the tolerance, the second attempt launched and landed successfully. The test ended with a hard landing – at 10 m/s – most likely due to partial helium ingestion from the fuel header tank. Three landing legs were not locked in place, producing a slight lean after landing. Although the vehicle initially remained intact, the impact crushed the legs and part of the leg skirt. Eight minutes later the prototype exploded.

SN11 accomplished a cryogenic proof test on March 12 that included a test of the reaction control system (RCS), followed by a static fire test on March 15, 2021. Immediately after ignition, the test was aborted. Another static fire attempt led to reports that one of the three engines had been removed for repairs. A replacement engine was installed and a third static fire was attempted on March 26. A 10 km flight test was conducted in heavy fog on March 30. The test included engine cutoffs, flip maneuver, flap control and descent, along with a visible fire on engine 2 during the ascent. Just after the defective engine was re-ignited for the landing burn, SN11 lost telemetry at T+ 5:49 and disintegrated.

SN12 through SN14 never launched.

==== SN15–SN19 ====
SN15 introduced improved avionics software, an updated aft skirt propellant architecture, and a new Raptor design and configuration. A Starlink antenna on the side of the vehicle was another new feature. SN15 underwent an ambient temperature pressure test on April 9, 2021, followed by a cryogenic proof test on April 12, and a header tank cryogenic proof test on April 13. A static fire was conducted on April 26, and a header tank static fire on April 27 followed. A 10 km (33,000 ft) high-altitude flight test was conducted in overcast weather on May 5, achieving a soft touchdown. A small fire near the base started shortly after landing, though this was extinguished. After its engines were removed, it was moved to the Rocket Garden on May 31, 2021. On July 26, 2023, SN15 was scrapped.

SN16 was scrapped, while SN17, SN18, and SN19 were never completed.

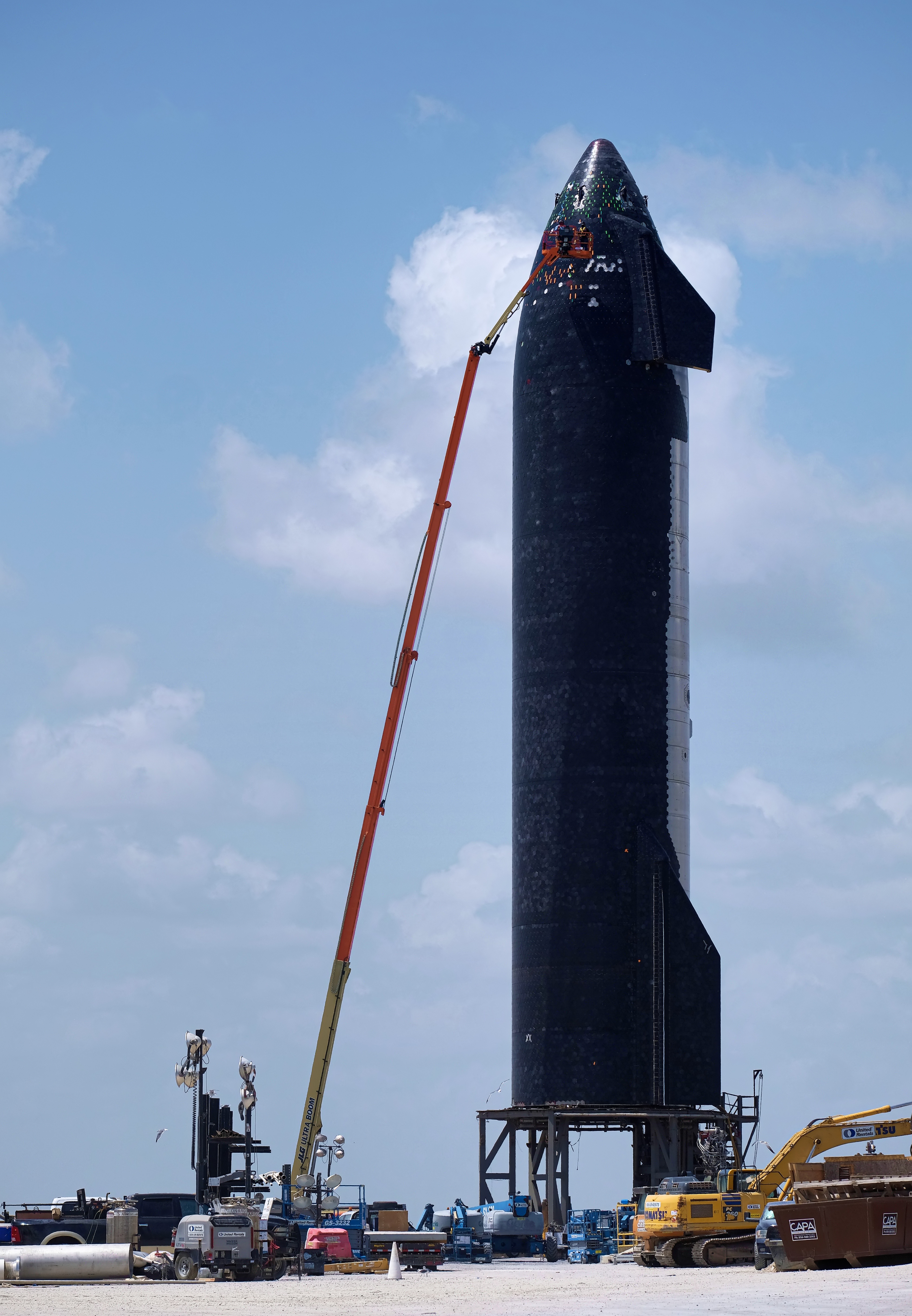
SN20 getting its heat shield inspected

==== SN20/Ship 20–Ship 23 ====
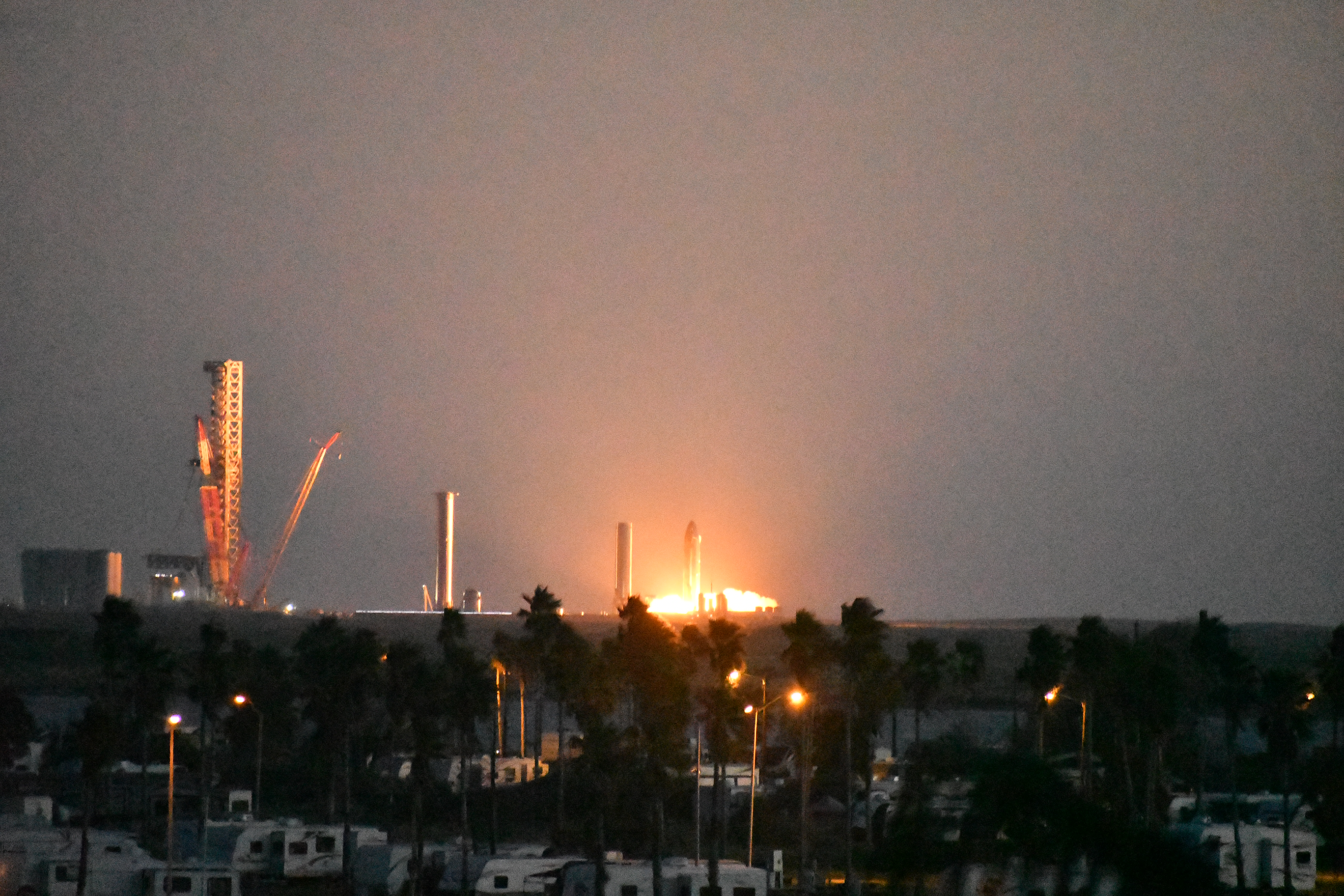
Static fire test of SN20 on October 21, 2021

SN20 was the first vehicle with a complete thermal protection system (TPS). SN20 rolled out to the launch mount on August 5, 2021, and was stacked onto Booster 4 for a fit test. U.S. Federal Communications Commission (FCC) filings in May 2021 by SpaceX stated that the orbital flight would launch from Boca Chica, Texas. After separation, Starship would enter orbit and around 90 minutes later attempt a soft ocean landing around 100 km off the coast of Kauai, Hawaii. However, S20 was retired in March 2022. As of April 2024, SN20 (Ship 20) remains in the Rocket Garden.

Ship 21 was scrapped before being completed.

Ship 22 moved to the Rocket Garden in late February 2022. Its nosecone was converted into a Human Landing System interior mockup. 3D artist TheSpaceEngineer has claimed that this mockup features two decks, the first containing the life support systems (ECLSS), and the second serving as habitation for the crew.

Ship 23 was scrapped and partially recycled in Ship 24.

=== Block 1 launches (S24–S32) ===
==== Ships 24 and 25 ====
Ship 24 was first spotted in November 2021, and conducted cryogenic proof tests on June 2, 2022, June 6, and June 7. On June 9, Ship 24 was rolled back to the production site for engine installation, and was rolled to Suborbital Pad B on July 5. Ship 24 conducted a series of spin prime tests in mid-late July. It completed a two-engine static fire test on August 9, followed by an additional spin prime test on August 25. On September 8, 2022, Ship 24 underwent a six-engine static fire test. The ship was subsequently stacked on top of Booster 7 in mid-October, followed by two destacks in October and early November. On December 15, Ship 24 conducted a single-engine static test fire. In January 2023, Booster 7 and Ship 24 conducted a Wet Dress Rehearsal. On April 20, 2023, Ship 24 was destroyed in flight along with Booster 7 after spinning out of control.

Ship 25 was a Starship prototype similar to Ship 24, equipped with a heat shield and a payload bay, though this was permanently welded shut. It was used to test the cryogenic test stand at Massey's test site. During the third week of May 2023, Ship 25 was moved to the launch site and lifted onto suborbital pad B for engine testing. On June 21, 2023, Ship 25 performed a successful spin prime test, followed by a six-engine static fire test. It was lifted onto B9 for the first time on September 5, and was destacked several times throughout the rest of the month and mid-October. On October 22, B9 underwent two partial cryogenic tests, while S25 was not tested, followed by a full wet dress rehearsal (WDR) two days later. On November 18, 2023, Ship 25 was launched atop Booster 9 on the second Integrated Flight Test, with Ship 25 successfully separating from Booster 9. Near the end of its burn, a LOX dump started a fire in the engine bay, causing an explosion. The autonomous flight termination system activated, destroying the vehicle.

==== Ships 26 and 27 ====
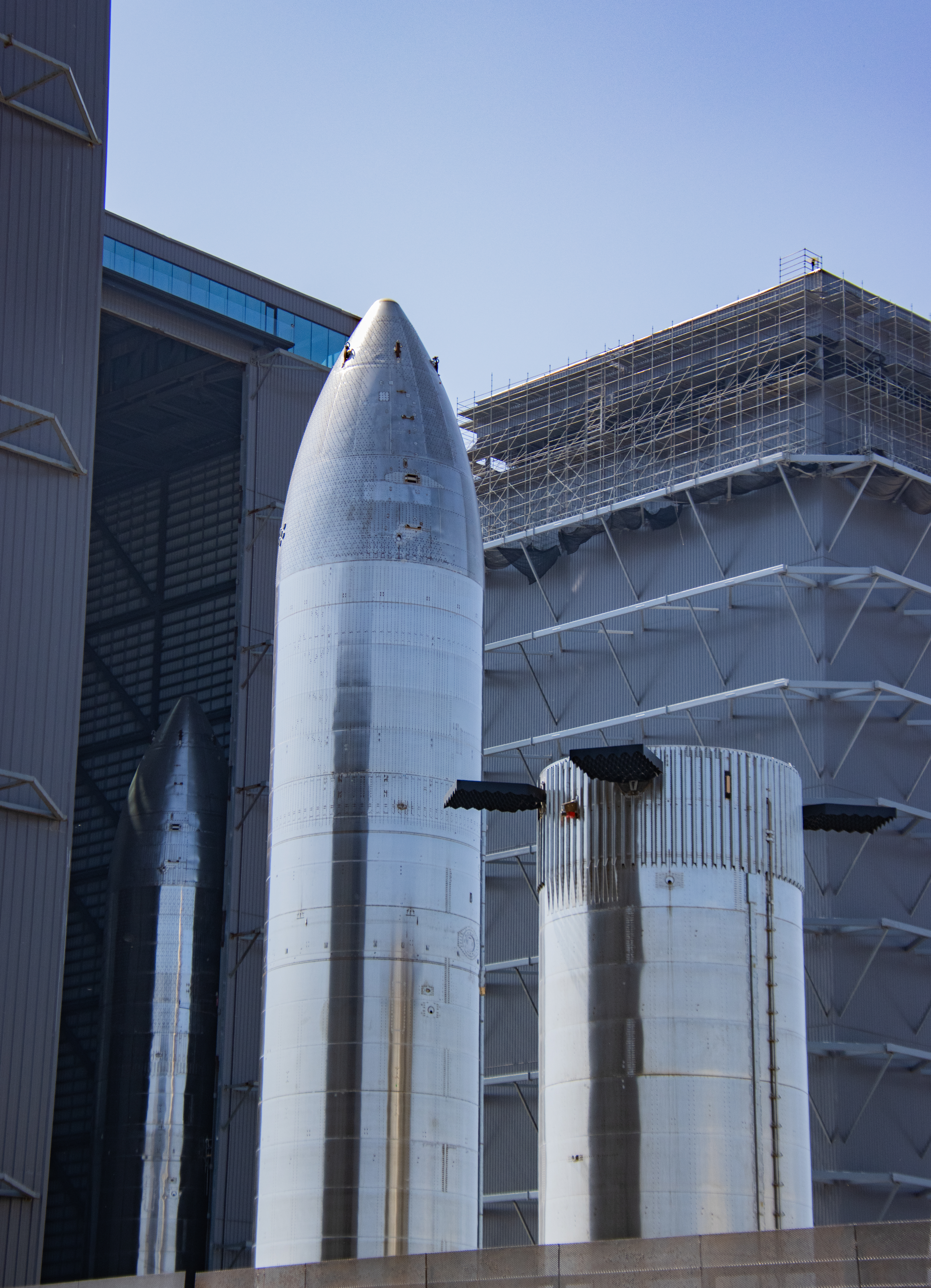
Ship 27, Ship 26 and Booster 10 forward section under construction in Starbase build site, March 2023

Ship 26 was an expendable Starship prototype, lacking heat shield tiles and flaps. Ship 26 also lacked a payload bay door. On September 9, 2023, S26 was moved to Suborbital Pad B for static fire testing. S26 then underwent a cryogenic test on October 9, 2023, followed by a preburner test with a single engine nine days later, and a single-engine static fire test on October 20, 2023, simulating a deorbit burn. S26 was rolled to the Massey's site on May 8, 2024, for static fire stand testing. S26 conducted a cryogenic test on May 24, followed by a six-engine static fire on June 3. S26's engines were removed on August 14. It was moved into the High Bay on November 20, where it was scrapped.

Like S26, S27 was an expendable prototype, lacking heat shield tiles. It was the first Ship to have a reinforced payload dispenser. Ship 27 was scrapped on July 20, 2023, after the common dome failed. S27's aft section was then converted into a test article for the engine shielding design present on S25.

==== Ships 28–32 ====
Ship 28, along with subsequent Block 1 models, features heat shield tiles as well as reinforced Starlink satellite dispensers. S28 underwent cryogenic testing in July 2023. On December 14, S28 was moved to the launch site and lifted onto Suborbital Pad B, where it completed a spin prime test on December 16, followed by a six-engine static fire test on December 20, and a deorbit burn test on December 29. S28 was moved to the Orbital Launch Site for IFT-3 on February 10, and was stacked onto B10. The combined vehicle conducted two aborted wet dress rehearsal attempts on February 14 and 16. It was returned to Suborbital Pad B on February 19, where it underwent a spin prime test on February 26. On March 3, 2024, B10 and S28 completed a wet dress rehearsal, followed by a final destack on March 5 for FTS installation. FTS was armed on March 8, 2024, and S28 was restacked on March 10, 2024. S28 flew with B10 on March 14, and reached orbit. It conducted tests of the Payload Dispenser and fuel transfer system, before being destroyed during reentry.

On September 22, 2023, S29 was moved to Massey's for cryogenic testing, where it was cryogenically tested on September 26. On February 29, S29 was moved to the launch site, where it underwent a cryogenic test on March 7, followed by a spin prime test on March 11. On March 12, 2024, S29 was briefly removed from the launch site to prevent damage from IFT-3, before returning ahead of two static fire tests on March 25 and 27. On May 15, S29 was lifted onto B11, with the combined vehicle completing a partial cryogenic test on May 16, and a full wet dress rehearsal on May 20. A second wet dress rehearsal was conducted on May 28. On May 29, S29 was destacked for final tile work and Flight Termination System (FTS) installation, with FTS installation occurring on May 30. S29 was stacked onto B11 for the final time on June 5. On June 6, S29 was launched with B11 on IFT-4, with S29 completing a full ascent burn with no engine failures. It retained attitude control into reentry, despite the near-complete loss of a forward flap, and achieved a successful landing burn.

S30 was moved to Massey's test site for cryogenic testing on December 30, 2023. On January 3, 2024, S30 underwent its first cryogenic test. On May 1, it was rolled to the Suborbital Launch Site, where it was lifted onto Suborbital Pad B for static fire testing. It conducted a cryogenic test on May 7, followed by an aborted static fire test, and a six-engine static fire test on May 8. On June 11, SpaceX began removing and replacing S30's thermal protection system, adding a backup ablative layer. S30 was rolled to Massey's on July 21, ahead of a six-engine static fire on July 26, and rolled back to the production site on July 27. One of S30's Raptor Vacuum engines was replaced on August 3, and it was rolled back to Massey's on August 6, where it conducted a spin prime test on August 7. SpaceX claimed that Booster 12 (B12) and S30 were ready to fly on August 8. S30 was then rolled back to the production site. On September 21, S30 was lifted onto B12. A partial wet dress rehearsal was conducted on September 23, followed by a second partial wet dress rehearsal on October 7, followed by S30 being destacked for FTS installation. FTS was installed on both vehicles on October 9, and S30 was stacked onto B12 for Flight 5 on October 11. On October 13, S30 launched on B12, and reached the desired trajectory after a nominal ascent burn with no engine failures. Like S29, S30 retained attitude control through reentry, and successfully reignited its engines for a splashdown in the Indian Ocean. As of October 13, 2024, S30 is the heaviest artificial object to reenter Earth's atmosphere.

On December 14, 2023, S31 was moved to the Rocket Garden, before being moved back into the High Bay on January 4. It was rolled to Massey's test site for cryogenic testing on May 11, with the first test ending prematurely due to an electrical anomaly. After being repaired, it returned to Massey's, where it was cryogenically tested on July 2 and 3. On July 5, S31 was moved to Mega Bay 2 for engine installation. The process of replacing S31's thermal protection system began in early August. On September 6, S31 was rolled to Massey's for static fire testing. It attempted to static fire on September 8, with the test being aborted due to the weather. S31 conducted a static fire on September 18, and it was rolled back to the production site on September 20. S31 was moved to the launch site for IFT-6 on November 11, where its Flight Termination System was installed on November 12. It was stacked onto Booster 13 (B13) on November 14, with the combined vehicle conducting a partial wet dress rehearsal on November 17. On November 19, S31 launched on B13, and reached the desired trajectory. After conducting a relight of a Raptor engine, S31 reentered the atmosphere, and successfully completed the landing burn for a splashdown in the Indian Ocean. Several components of S31, including multiple tiles and COPVs, were recovered for analysis in Australia.

On November 24, Elon Musk implied that S32 would be the last Block 1 Starship. SpaceX later confirmed that Flight 7 and subsequent launches would use Block 2 vehicles. It was rolled into the High Bay on February 7, 2025, where S32 was scrapped.

=== Block 2 launches (S33–S38) ===
Block 2 ships feature a new forward flap design, increased propellant capacity, and an increase in thrust. Additionally, the leeward side of the vehicle has some external stringers. These vehicles will be a total of 1.8 m (5 ft 11 in) taller than the previous Block 1 ships.

On July 24, 2024, S33's nosecone and payload bay were rolled into Mega Bay 2 (MB2). Stacking of the vehicle was completed on August 23. On October 26, S33 rolled to the Massey's test site, where it conducted a series of cryogenic tests. After engine installation, it returned to Massey's test site on December 11. It conducted a spin prime on December 12 with an aborted static fire on December 14, and a static fire on December 15. This was followed by a single-engine static fire, and a return to MB2 for final pre-flight modifications. Payload integration occurred on January 7. Ship 33 rolled to the launch site for launch on January 9, where it was stacked onto Booster 14 (B14), surpassing Starship Block 1 as the tallest rocket ever assembled. The combined vehicle conducted a wet dress rehearsal on January 10, before being destacked on the 11th. It was restacked for launch the next day. On January 16, Ship 33 launched atop Booster 14, but was destroyed during the ascent burn.

On September 19, 2024, S34's nosecone was rolled into the High Bay ahead of integration with the payload bay. The combined assembly was then rolled into the Starfactory, and from there into Mega Bay 2. On January 15, 2025, S34 rolled to the Massey's test site for cryogenic testing. It completed its first test on January 17, followed by a second cryo test. It then returned to Mega Bay 2 for engine and aft flap installation. S34 rolled to Massey's for static fire testing on February 10. It conducted a long-duration static fire on February 11, before returning to Mega Bay 2. Starlink simulators were installed on March 1, after which S34 was rolled to the launch site and lifted onto B15 for launch. A launch attempt was aborted late into the count on March 3. S34 was destacked on March 4, and restacked on March 5 after an aborted attempt earlier that day. On March 6, S34 launched with B15, successfully separating from the booster. Like on the previous flight, S34 was destroyed late into the ascent burn, spinning out of control before losing contact.

S35's payload bay was rolled into the High Bay ahead of stacking with its nosecone. Stacking was completed on January 31, with S35 rolling to Massey's on March 10. It conducted three cryogenic tests on March 11 and 12, and returned to the production site on March 13. On April 29, S35 was rolled to Massey's test site, before aborting a static fire the same day. It conducted a single-engine static fire on April 30, replicating an "in-space burn". After a static fire was aborted on May 1, S35 performed a long-duration second static fire on the same day, before returning to Mega Bay 2 for inspections. After a week in Mega Bay 2, it was rolled to Massey's for additional static fire testing. A static fire attempt was aborted on May 11, with the long-duration test being completed on May 12. It was then rolled back into Mega Bay 2 on May 13, before returning to Massey's for additional engine testing. It aborted a spin prime attempt on May 22, completing the test later that day. It returned to Mega Bay 2 on May 23, where it received its eight Starlink simulators on May 24. S35 rolled to the launch site on May 25, where it was lifted onto B14. S35 launched atop B14 on May 25, and successfully separated from the booster. Unlike on flights 7 and 8, S35 successfully made it past engine cutoff. Due to an issue with the payload door, it did not deploy its eight Starlink simulators. Additionally, a fuel leak resulted in a loss of attitude control of the ship. This resulted in S35 being safed before reentry, which included the venting of all onboard propellant.

S36's payload bay and nosecone rolled into Mega Bay 2 in mid-February. Stacking completed after one month. On April 26, S36 was rolled to Massey's for cryogenic testing, where it conducted a cryogenic test on April 27. It returned to the production site on April 29. S36 was rolled to the Massey's test site on June 15, followed by a single-engine static fire test on June 16. As propellant was being loaded for static fire testing on June 18, Ship 36's upper half became compromised, with preliminary indications suggesting a COPV failure at the payload bay. This caused an explosion which destroyed the vehicle and severely damaged the Massey's test site.

S37's payload bay and nosecone were moved into Mega Bay 2 (MB2) on March 15, 2025. Its CH4 transfer tubes were moved into MB2 in mid-April. On May 29, S37 was rolled to the Massey's test site for cryogenic testing. After completing these tests, it returned to MB2 on June 4. On July 28, S37 was rolled to the launch site for a static fire, where it was lifted onto Pad 1. Ship 37 aborted a single-engine static fire attempt on July 30. The test was complete on July 31, followed by a six-engine static fire test on August 1. It returned to MB2 on August 3, where a Raptor Vacuum was replaced on August 5. It was rolled to Pad 1 on August 11 for additional engine testing. The first attempt at the test was aborted on August 12, with the second attempt resulting in a spin prime on August 13. It returned to Mega Bay 2 on August 14, with payload integration occurring on August 23. Following this, S37 was rolled to the launch site and stacked onto Booster 16. The first launch attempt was aborted about ten minutes into propellant load, with a second scrub forty seconds before the launch target. The third attempt to launch was successful, with S37 successfully deploying eight Starlink simulators. It then went on to relight one of its engines in space, before reentering and splashing down in the Indian Ocean.

S38's nosecone was stacked onto its payload bay with flaps in mid-April 2025. It was rolled to the Massey's test site for cryogenic testing on July 27. On July 30, S38 conducted a cryogenic proof test, followed by a return to the production site on August 1. Engine installation began on August 14. S38 rolled out to Pad 1 on September 17 for static fire testing. The first static fire attempt ended in an abort as propellant load began on the vehicle. A second attempt on September 19 also ended in an abort, with the test being completed on the third attempt. S38 would then return to Mega Bay 2 on September 24. On October 11, following installation of its payload, S38 returned to Pad 1 for flight test 11, where it was stacked onto B15-2.

=== Block 3 launches (S39–subsequent) ===
Block 3 ships feature a different tile design, Raptor 3 engines, as well as hardware facilitating refueling operations in Low Earth Orbit (LEO), such as docking ports and a redesigned quick disconnect. The switch to Raptor 3 engines enabled a number of design changes including the removal of most of the aft section's shielding.

S39's LOX (liquid oxygen) header tank was spotted in Starfactory on March 16, 2025. It was installed into its nosecone on April 9. The payload bay was integrated with the rest of the nosecone in mid-August. Stacking of the ship concluded in mid-November. S39 rolled to Massey's on a repurposed static fire stand on February 26, 2026, where it conducted a cryogenic test on February 28. This testing continued on March 2, with the vehicle returning to the production site on March 8. Rollout for engine testing occurred on April 11, with a potential spin prime on April 12. Ship 39 completed a roughly minute-long static fire on April 14. It was rolled to the launch site on May 9. Following stacking with Booster 19 (B19), it had an aborted wet dress rehearsal on May 9. The test was completed successfully on May 11. Ship 39 launched on May 22, after an aborted attempt the day before, and successfully reached an orbit close to the desired one despite losing a Raptor vacuum shortly after stage separation. This engine failure forced an abort on the planned relight test, though deployment of all twenty-two Starlinks was successful. Reentry was also successful, and Ship 39 splashed down into the Indian Ocean.

S40's stacking completed on March 2, 2026, with cryogenic testing at Massey's in early May. Following engine installation, the vehicle returned to Massey's on June 23, where it underwent what was either an aborted static fire or an ignitor test on June 24, and a single-engine static fire on June 25. It then returned to the production site the next day. It would later return to Massey's for a six-engine static fire, which occurred on July 1. Ship 40 launched on July 24 after two aborted attempts, performing a successful flight including an engine relight and soft splashdown, which Ship 40 survived. After splashdown, SpaceX recovery vessel GO Australis rendezvoused with Ship 40 in the Indian Ocean, followed by tugs Normand Ranger and Skimmer Tide. After 24 days at sea, Normand Ranger and GO Australis towed Ship 40 to the shore of Christmas Island on August 18. The heavy-lift semi-submersible ship Boskalis Forte was contracted by SpaceX to transport Ship 40 back to Texas for engineering analysis. Ship 40 was returned to Starbase aboard Forte, arriving in the Port of Brownsville on October 7, 2026. It rolled back to the production site on October 11, being lifted into a vertical position in Mega Bay 2 on October 12.

S41's nosecone and forward dome were spotted in Mega Bay 2 on April 20, 2026, and April 21 respectively. Ship 41 performed two cryogenic tests at Massey's on June 29, preceding Ship 40's static fire. It returned to the production site the following day. Ship 41 rolled out to Massey's on August 18. It conducted a single-engine static fire simulating a deorbit burn on August 19, and a six-engine static fire on August 20. On September 28, Ship 41 launched atop Booster 21 on Flight 14, becoming the first Starship to reach orbit. Despite the early shutdown of one of its Raptor Vacuum engines during ascent, it completed its orbital insertion burn and deployed all 26 Starlink V3 satellites it carried. SpaceX ended the flight early after evaluating the ship's systems, and Ship 41 reentered after just under two orbits, splashing down in the Pacific Ocean north of Hawaii.

S42 began stacking on July 3, 2026. It rolled out to Massey's for cryogenic testing on September 2, with cryogenic tests being conducted on September 3. Ship 42 rolled back to the production site on September 6. Ship 42 rolled out to the launch site on September 11. It was lifted by the chopsticks to stack height, and the SQD arm conducted several attachment tests with the vehicle. Ship 42 rolled back to the production site on September 13. With its engines removed, it returned to Massey's on October 9 for a third round of cryogenic proof testing. After its engines were reinstalled, Ship 42 performed a single-engine static fire simulating a deorbit burn on October 26, followed by a six-engine static fire lasting over 60 seconds on October 27. On October 29, Elon Musk stated that Ship 42 would be the first ship caught by the launch tower. Ship 42 rolled out to the launch site on November 12 ahead of Flight 15, and was successfully caught by the launch tower following a launch on November 13, and a deorbit and reentry on November 14, becoming the first ship to be caught.

S43 was rolled to Massey's on October 22, 2026, and completed two cryogenic proof tests by October 24. It then returned to Mega Bay 2 for engine installation, with static fire testing expected in December. Ship 43 has also undergone chopstick tests at Pad 2, and together with Booster 23 is expected to be shipped to the Kennedy Space Center to fly the first Starship launch from Launch Complex 39A on Flight 16.

S44 completed final stacking in Mega Bay 2 on October 20, 2026, and is expected to fly on Flight 17, possibly in early 2027.

== Test articles ==
=== Starship-based test articles ===
Serial number	Tests	Decommission Date	Status
LOX HT	2	January 25, 2020	Destroyed
SN2	1	March 2020	Retired
SN7	2	June 23, 2020	Destroyed
SN7.1	2	September 22, 2020	Destroyed
SN7.2	2	May 22, 2021	Retired
SN12	1	2021	Scrapped
S24.1	3	2023	Scrapped
S26.1	3	September 2023	Destroyed
S24.2	2	2024	Scrapped
TT16	4	October 27, 2025	Scrapped

Liquid Oxygen Header Test Tank (LOX HTT) was based on the LOX header tank, as well as surrounding parts of the nosecone. On January 24, 2020, the tank underwent a pressurization test which lasted several hours. The following day it was tested to destruction.

SN2 was a test tank used to test welding quality and thrust puck design. The thrust puck is found on the bottom of the vehicle where in later Starship tests up to three sea-level Raptor engines would be mounted. SN2 passed a pressure test on March 8, 2020. It was moved around the Sanchez site on August 8, 2025.

SN7 was a pathfinder test article for the switch to type 304L stainless steel. A cryogenic proof test was performed on June 15, 2020, achieving a pressure of 7.6 bar (110 psi) before a leak occurred. During a pressurize-to-failure test on June 23, 2020, the tank burst at an unknown pressure.

SN7.1 was the second 304L test tank, with the goal of reaching a higher failure pressure. The tank was repeatedly tested in September, and tested to destruction on September 23. The bulkhead came apart at a pressure of 8 bar (115 psi) in ullage and 9 bar (130 psi) at base.

SN7.2 was created to test thinner walls, and therefore, lower mass. It is believed to be constructed from 3 mm steel sheets rather than the 4 mm thickness of its predecessors. On January 26, 2021, SN7.2 passed a cryogenic proof test. On February 4, during a pressurize-to-failure test, the tank developed a leak. On March 15, SN7.2 was retired.

S24.1 was a test article designed to test the redesigned aft section present on Block 1 ships after S24. It conducted a single test on the can-crusher on October 7, 2022. After this test failed, it received modifications before completing two tests on December 5 and 6.

S26.1 was a test tank designed to test the aft section of Block 1 ships after S24.1's failure. It conducted two tests on the can-crusher, before being moved off in July 2023. On September 21, 2023, it was tested to destruction.

S24.2 was a test article designed to test the payload bay of Starlink dispenser vehicles. On September 28, 2023, it was moved to the Massey's test site. It performed two tests before subsequently being scrapped.

TT16 is a test tank designed for testing the Block 2 ship aft section, consisting of an aft section and a small common dome section. Its official designation is not yet known. On July 18, it was rolled to the Massey's test site for structural testing. It conducted two cryogenic tests on July 25, followed by another test on September 6, 2024. It was returned to the production site in early October for scrapping. In January 2025, it was moved into Starfactory, potentially to test modifications made to S34. On February 4, it rolled to Massey's for additional testing, this time of the bumpers needed to enable a ship to be caught.

=== General test articles ===
Serial number	Tests	Decommission Date	Status
TT1	1	January 10, 2020	Destroyed
TT2	2	January 29, 2020	Destroyed
GSE 4.1	2	January 18, 2022	Destroyed
EDOME	2	Late October 2022	Destroyed
EDOME2	1	December 2023	Scrapped

Test Tank 1 (TT1) was a subscale test tank consisting of two forward bulkheads connected by a small barrel section. TT1 was used to test new materials and construction methods. On January 10, 2020, TT1 was tested to failure as part of an ambient temperature test, reaching a pressure of 7.1 bar (103 psi).

Test Tank 2 (TT2) was another subscale test tank similar to TT1. On January 27, 2020, TT2 underwent an ambient temperature pressure test where it reached a pressure of 7.5 bar (109 psi) before a leak occurred. Two days later, it underwent a cryogenic proof test to destruction, bursting at 8.5 bar (123 psi).

GSE 4.1 was first spotted in August 2021 and was the first ground support equipment (GSE) test tank built, made from parts of GSE 4. It underwent a cryogenic proof test in August 2021 before it was rolled to the Sanchez site. It was rolled back to the launch site in November 2021, where it underwent an apparent cryogenic proof test to failure on January 18, 2022, when it burst at an unknown pressure.

EDOME was a test tank created to test flatter domes, possibly used on future Starship prototypes. It was moved to the launch site in July 2022, and then back to the production site the next month, after undergoing no tests. It was later moved from the production site to the Massey's test site in late September 2022, where it was damaged during a cryogenic pressure test to failure. After repairs, it was tested to destruction in late October 2022.

EDOME 2 was a test tank which was likely designed to continue testing a flatter dome design. As of October 4, 2023, its official designation is unknown. It was tested once, before being scrapped for unknown reasons.

== See also ==
- List of Falcon 9 first-stage boosters
- Starship HLS, lunar variant of the Starship spacecraft
- SpaceX Starbase, launch site of Super Heavy
- Starlink, large satellite constellation by SpaceX
- List of Super Heavy boosters
