= Flight test instrumentation =

Monitoring equipment used during flight testing

Flight test instrumentation (FTI) is monitoring and recording equipment fitted to aircraft for specific flight tests. The development program for a new aircraft design has a number of aircraft each of which has tasks to perform for development and certification tests. They are each fitted with FTI specific to their allotted tasks.

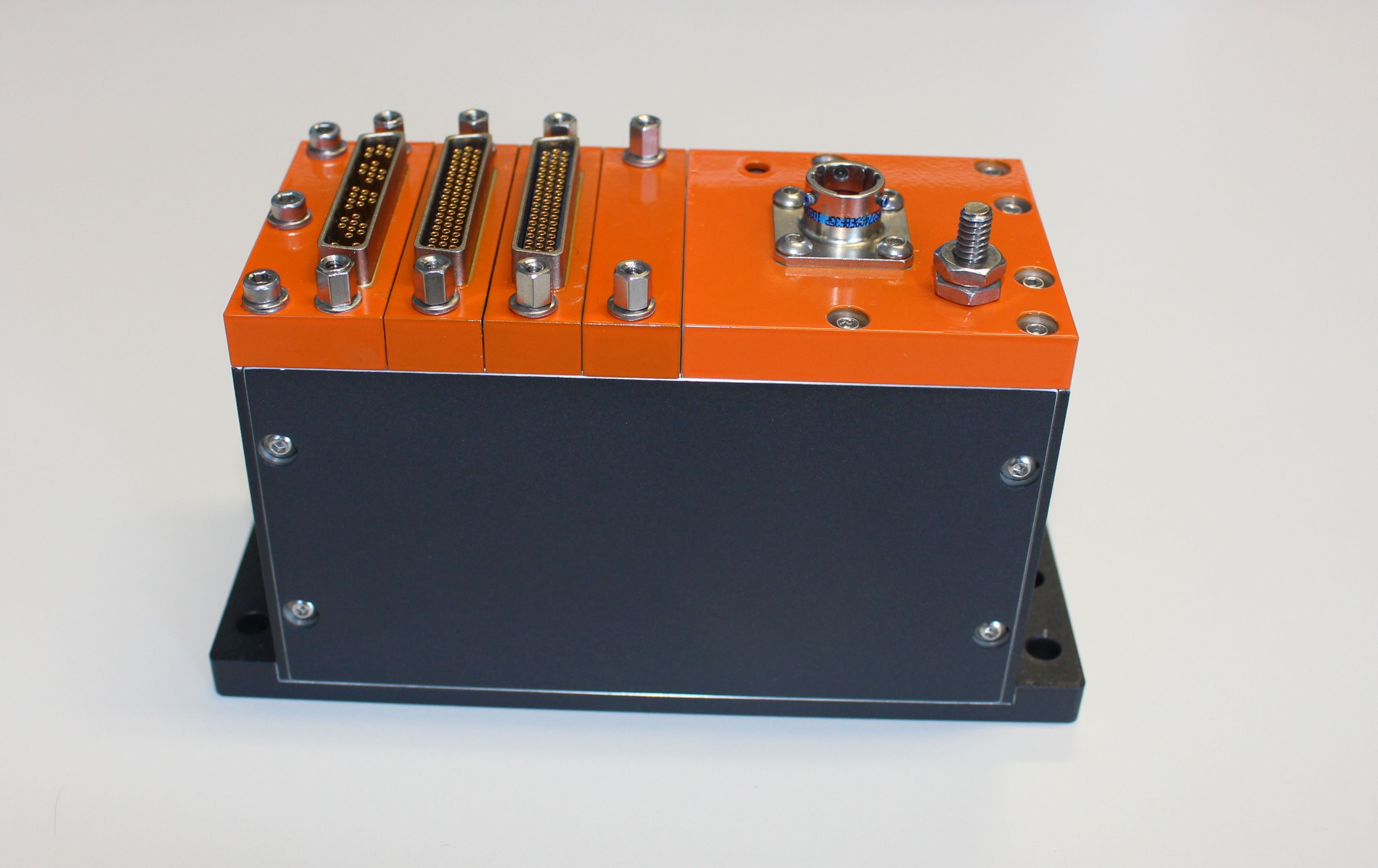
A small modular data acquisition unit

Different types of transducers are required to respond to particular physical quantities, such as air pressure on the wing surface or fuel pressure in a fuel tube, and which produce an electrical equivalent which is recorded by a data acquisition system.

A core component of a data acquisition system are the data acquisition units (DAU). These are electronic boxes that interface to FTI sources and are typically designed to be rugged and reliable. The current trend is to make these units as small as possible and move them closer to the sensors. This leads to many challenges for the designers of a data acquisition chassis such as how to cope with inhospitable environments and maintain functionality with smaller designs. For the end user it means shorter wiring, better accuracy and easier installation and maintenance.

So called commercial off-the-shelf (COTS) systems are commonly used to keep costs low and speed delivery. This approach, and indeed the use of FTI originally developed for aerospace applications well within the Earth's atmosphere, is also increasingly common for space launchers and vehicles. More extensive testing and qualification is generally performed to help ensure reliability in the more hostile environments encountered at high altitudes and in space (for example ionizing radiation).
