= List of Starship upper stage flight tests =

In flight tests of SpaceX's fully reusable superheavy-lift vehicle

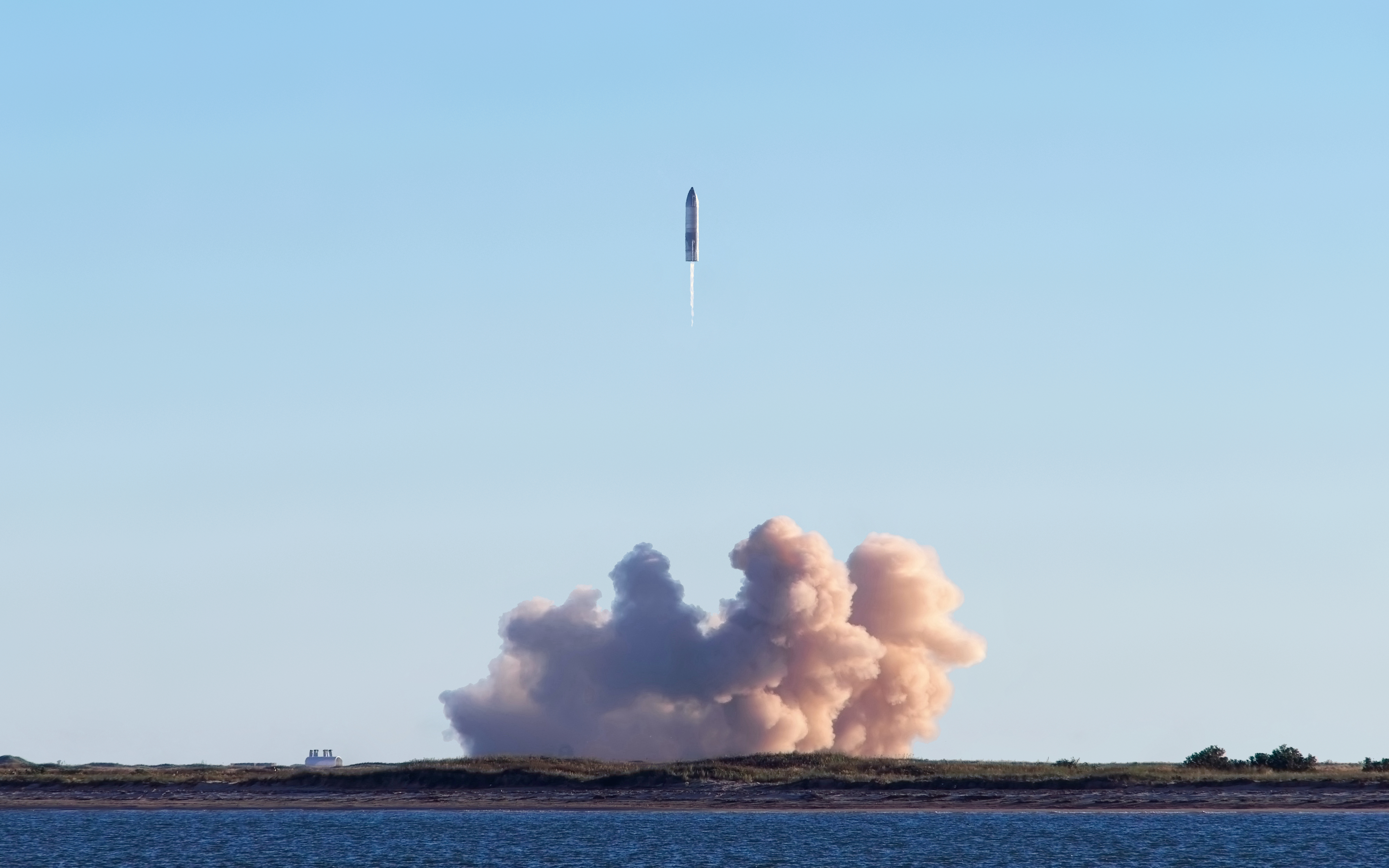
The launch of SpaceX's SN8 Starship prototype

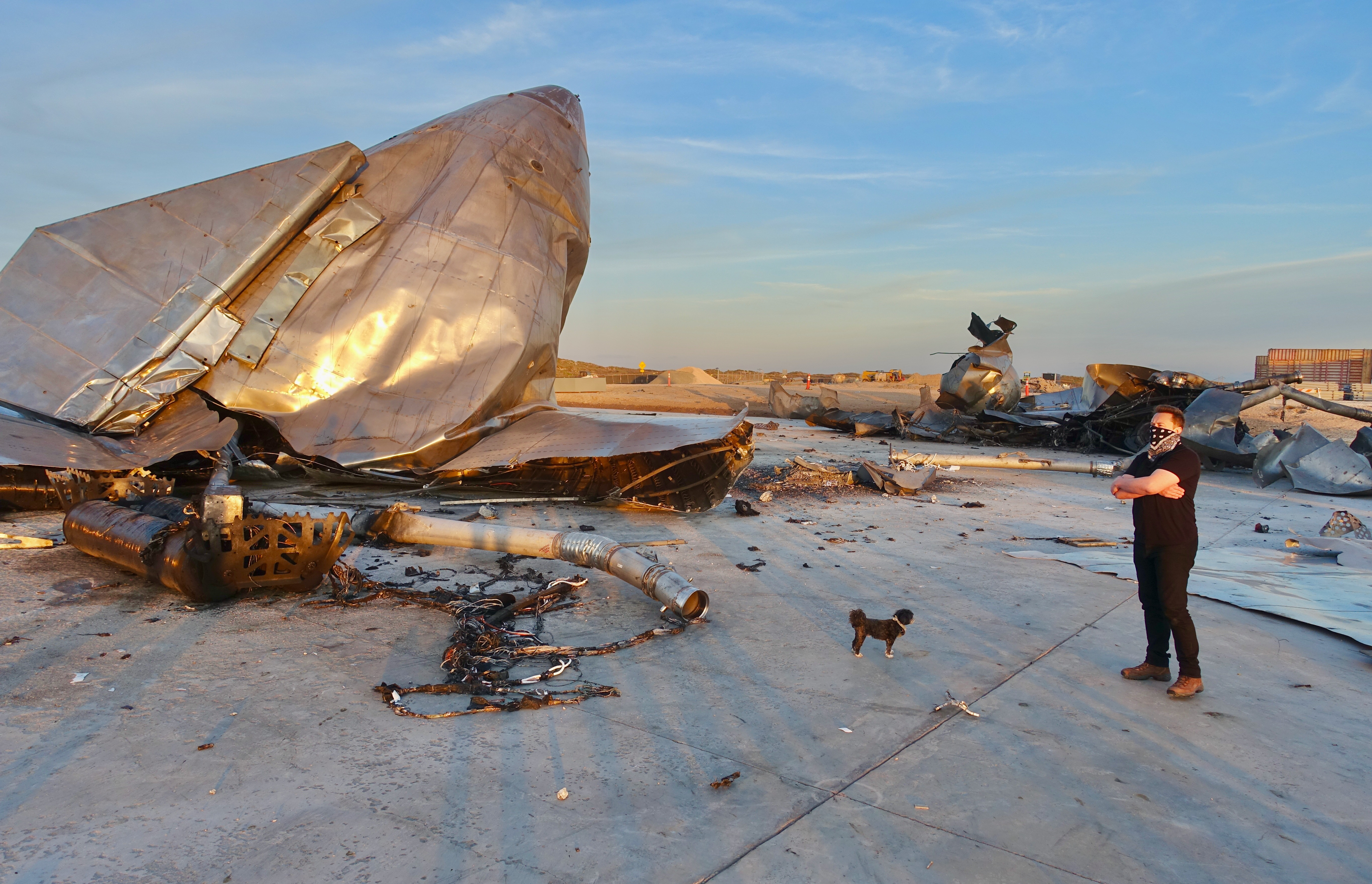
SN8 remains after hard landing and subsequent explosion

SpaceX conducted eleven flight tests of prototype rockets for the Starship development program from 2019 to 2021. These tests included prototypes of the ship, or upper stage, rather than the full two-stage Starship launch vehicle. The scope of these tests ranged from short static fires, or tethered engine firings, to launches to approximately 10 km with landing attempts.

SpaceX began testing with the test article Starhopper in 2019, including two short hops with the article tethered to the ground. Starhopper and two early ship prototypes, SN5 and SN6, then completed untethered flights. Five ships, beginning with SN8, performed flights to approximately 12.5 km (SN8 only) or 10 km. On descent, the ships flipped into a "belly flop" maneuver, falling in the horizontal position with aerodynamic control from the four body flaps. This was to simulate the descent after atmospheric reentry on an orbital mission. After falling to an altitude of about 500 m, the engines relit and flipped the ships vertical for landing on a concrete pad, with varying degrees of success.

== Flight History ==
=== Launch outcomes ===
- Success (tethered)
- Success (untethered)

=== Landing outcomes ===
- Loss before landing
- Loss on landing
- Loss after landing
- Success (tethered)
- Success (untethered)

Flight No.	Date and time (UTC)	Vehicles	Launch site (Note: All launches are from Starbase, Texas)	Flight apogee	Duration (mm:ss)	Launch outcome	Landing outcome
-	3 April 2019	Starhopper	Suborbital Launch Site	<0.3 m (1 ft 0 in)	~00:03	Success	—N/a
-	The first firing of Starhopper and the first tethered hop (according to Musk). The burn was a few seconds in duration and the vehicle was tethered to the ground. It was not possible to confirm the lift off in public video recordings of the test.						
-	5 April 2019	Starhopper	Suborbital Launch Site	1 m (3 ft 3 in)	~00:05	Success	—N/a
-	Tethered hop which hit tether limits.						
1	25 July 2019	Starhopper	Suborbital Launch Site	20 m (66 ft)	~00:22	Success	Success
1	First free (untethered) flight test.						
2	27 August 2019 22:00	Starhopper	Suborbital Launch Site	150 m (490 ft)	00:57	Success	Success
2	Starhopper was retired after this launch and used as a water tank at the production site.						
3	4 August 2020 23:57	Starship SN5	Suborbital Pad A	150 m (490 ft)	00:51	Success	Success
3	Second 150-meter hop, and first hop of a full Starship prototype.						
4	3 September 2020 17:47	Starship SN6	Suborbital Pad A	150 m (490 ft)	00:52	Success	Success
4	Third 150-meter hop, and second hop of a full Starship prototype.						
5	9 December 2020 22:45	Starship SN8	Suborbital Pad A	12.5 km (41,000 ft)	06:42	Success	Failure
5	First high-altitude flight test. Vehicle successfully launched, ascended, performed the skydive descent maneuver, relit the engines fueled from header tanks, and steered to the landing pad. The flip maneuver from horizontal descent to vertical was successful, but a sudden pressure loss in the methane header tank caused by the flip maneuver reduced fuel supply and thrust, resulting in a hard landing and explosion.						
6	2 February 2021 20:25	Starship SN9	Suborbital Pad B	10 km (33,000 ft)	06:26	Success	Failure
6	A Raptor failing to start caused SN9 to over-rotate and hit the landing pad. The vehicle was destroyed on impact.						
7	3 March 2021 23:15	Starship SN10	Suborbital Pad A	10 km (33,000 ft)	06:20 (Note: Despite making an intact landing and beginning the detanking procedures, the vehicle suffered an explosion several minutes later destroying the vehicle in the process. SpaceX called it a successful landing but later acknowledged a problem with lower-than-expected engine thrust causing a hard landing exceeding maximum leg loads and the vehicle exploded.)	Success	Partial failure
7	SN10 launched and ascended nominally, but experienced a hard landing with a slight lean after the landing, and a fire developed near the base of the rocket. Eight minutes after landing, SN10 exploded, potentially due to helium ingestion from the fuel header tank.						
8	30 March 2021 13:00	Starship SN11	Suborbital Pad B	10 km (33,000 ft)	05:49 (Note: Time until vehicle telemetry loss)	Success	Failure
8	SN11 had engine issues during ascent (according to Elon Musk). Vehicle lost before T+6:00. Musk stated that a "relatively small" methane leak caused a fire on one of the Raptor engines during ascent, causing the engine to experience a hard start when relit.						
9	5 May 2021 22:24	Starship SN15	Suborbital Pad A	10 km (33,000 ft)	05:59	Success	Success
9	SN15 was a new iteration of prototype Starship with many upgrades over previous vehicles. SN15 achieved a soft landing, with a small fire starting near the base shortly after landing. The post-flight fire was out within 20 minutes, and SN15 was retired by the end of the month. It was later scrapped in July 2023.						

== See also ==
- SpaceX Starship design history
- List of Falcon 9 and Falcon Heavy launches
