= Starship flight 16 =

Sixteenth launch of SpaceX Starship

- Mission type: Operational flight
- Operator: SpaceX

Spacecraft properties
- Spacecraft: Ship 43
- Spacecraft type: Starship (Block 3)
- Manufacturer: SpaceX

Start of mission
- Launch date: NET December 2026
- Rocket: Super Heavy (Block 3, B23)
- Launch site: LC-39A, Kennedy Space Center (planned)

End of mission
- Landing site: Super Heavy B23: LC-39A, KSC; Ship S43: LC-39A, KSC or OLP-2, Starbase, TX

Orbital parameters
- Reference system: Geocentric orbit
- Regime: Low Earth orbit

Payload
- Starlink Group 30-1

Starship flight 16 is a planned flight of the SpaceX Starship launch system, which would be its sixteenth launch and third operational flight. It is expected to be the first Starship launch from Launch Complex 39A at the Kennedy Space Center in Florida, and the first launch of the vehicle from outside Starbase in Texas. As of November 2026, the flight is targeted for no earlier than December 2026.

The mission is expected to use Booster 23 and Ship 43, the fifth pair of Block 3 vehicles to fly. Both vehicles completed cryogenic proof testing at Starbase in October 2026, and Ship 43 went through the same tower catch tests that preceded the first catch of a Starship upper stage on Flight 15.

== Background ==
=== Flight 15 ===
Flight 16 follows the first recovery of a Starship upper stage from orbit. On Flight 15, Ship 42 reached low Earth orbit, deployed 26 Starlink V3 satellites and remained in orbit for about 22 hours before returning to Starbase, where it was caught by the arms of the launch tower on November 14, 2026. Booster 22 called off its own catch attempt and diverted to a contingency splashdown in the Gulf of Mexico, where it was destroyed.

Elon Musk attributed the booster loss to slight underperformance of its engines, which left it short of propellant. He said the fix was to improve engine performance and consistency with Raptor V3.2 and to cut off most of the booster's engines about one second earlier, and that the loss would not change SpaceX's timeline toward "high volume, fully reusable Starship flights". He added that the next booster was almost ready for flight.

=== Launch Complex 39A ===
SpaceX has been building a Starship launch pad at LC-39A, alongside the pad's existing Falcon 9 and Falcon Heavy facilities, with a launch and catch tower equivalent to those at Starbase. On October 21, 2026, SpaceX vice president of launch Kiko Dontchev said that the pad's launch infrastructure was "effectively complete" and that the company hoped to launch Starship from Florida before the end of the year.

During 2026, SpaceX added two more liquid methane storage tanks at the pad, giving it nearly 5,000 t (4,900 long tons; 5,500 short tons) of methane, enough for about 3.8 launches, and expanded the liquid nitrogen supply for the water deluge system. A reinforced roof to protect the top of the tower during ship catches was installed on October 12, and the top-deck deluge was first tested on September 24. Full water deluge tests followed in early November.

Vehicles for Florida launches are built at Starbase and shipped individually by the barge You'll Thank Me Later up the Banana River to the Kennedy Space Center turn basin, the route formerly used for Space Shuttle external tanks and Space Launch System core stages. They are then prepared in a new Gigabay at SpaceX's Roberts Road facility before moving to the pad. The barge had already delivered a ship transport stand and a Starlink loader to the center.

== Vehicle preparation ==
=== Booster 23 ===
Booster 23 is a Block 3 Super Heavy booster expected to serve as the first stage for Flight 16. It completed an extended cryogenic proof test at the Massey's test site, lasting about 12 hours, on October 15, 2026. It returned to Massey's on October 28 for further testing and was back in Mega Bay 1 by October 30.

Unlike ships, boosters can be static-fired at LC-39A, so Booster 23's static fire is expected to take place at the pad, which will also help activate its systems.

=== Ship 43 ===
Ship 43 is a Block 3 Starship spacecraft expected to serve as the upper stage for Flight 16. It completed cryogenic proof testing on October 23, 2026, and was then moved to Mega Bay 2 for engine installation and final assembly. On October 26, it was taken to Orbital Launch Pad 2 at Starbase, where it was lifted by the tower's chopstick arms for catch-related tests similar to those carried out with Ship 42, and it returned to the production site on October 27.

Because SpaceX has no facility for testing ships at Kennedy Space Center, Ship 43 must complete its static fire at Starbase before being shipped to Florida.

Pre-launch milestones
Date	Vehicle	Milestone
October 15	Booster 23	Extended cryogenic proof test at Massey's, lasting about 12 hours
October 21	LC-39A	SpaceX says the launch infrastructure at LC-39A is "effectively complete"
October 23	Ship 43	Cryogenic proof test completed at Massey's
October 26–27	Ship 43	Lifted by the chopsticks at Orbital Launch Pad 2 for catch-related testing
October 28–30	Booster 23	Returned to Massey's for further testing, then rolled back to Mega Bay 1
November 5	LC-39A	Full water deluge test of the Starship pad

=== Regulatory approval ===
On January 29, 2026, the Federal Aviation Administration (FAA) issued a record of decision on its final environmental impact statement for Starship operations at LC-39A, covering up to 44 launches and up to 44 landings each of Super Heavy and Starship per year. The decision did not itself license a launch; as of November 18, 2026, a launch license for Flight 16 had not been announced.

== Mission profile ==
SpaceX has not yet published a profile for the mission. Ship 43 is expected to be shipped to Florida fully assembled, lacking only its payload and the charges for its flight termination system. At LC-39A, Booster 23 would perform propellant loading tests and a static fire to confirm that the pad is ready, after which Ship 43 would join it for integrated vehicle testing.

SpaceX had linked Flight 16 to the goal of bringing LC-39A into service before the end of 2026, and a December target is consistent with that goal. Based on the pace of earlier ship campaigns, NASASpaceFlight estimated that Ship 43 could be ready for its static fire in mid-December and for shipment in early to mid-January, which would put the first launch from LC-39A in late January 2027, though it noted that SpaceX can shorten the time between tests and fly earlier.

== See also ==
- List of Starship launches
- SpaceX Starship development
- Kennedy Space Center Launch Complex 39A
