= Cooper–Harper rating scale =

Criteria used by test pilots and engineers

The Cooper-Harper Handling Qualities Rating Scale (HQRS), sometimes Cooper-Harper Rating Scale (CHRS), is a pilot rating scale, a set of criteria used by test pilots and flight test engineers to evaluate the handling qualities of aircraft while performing a task during a flight test. The scale ranges from 1 to 10, with 1 indicating the best handling characteristics and 10 the worst. The criteria are evaluative and thus the scale is subjective.

== Background ==
=== Development ===
After World War II, the various U.S. military branches sent different models of their operational aircraft to the Ames Aeronautical Laboratory located at the Moffett Federal Airfield in Mountain View, California for evaluation of the planes' flight performance and flying qualities. The laboratory was operated by NACA, the predecessor of NASA. Most of the flights were conducted by George Cooper, Bob Innis, and Fred Drinkwater and took place at the remote test site at the Crows Landing Naval Auxiliary Landing Field in the central valley area east of Moffett Field.

What may be the most important contribution of the flying qualities evaluation programs and experiments conducted on the variable stability aircraft at Ames was George Cooper's standardized system for rating an aircraft's flying qualities. Cooper developed his rating system over several years as a result of the need to quantify the pilot's judgment of an aircraft's handling in a fashion that could be used in the stability and control design process. This came about because of his perception of the value that such a system would have, and because of the encouragement of his colleagues in the United States and England who were familiar with his initial attempts.

Cooper's approach forced a specific definition of the pilot's task and of its performance standards. Furthermore, it accounted for the demands the aircraft placed on the pilot in accomplishing a given task to some specified degree of precision. The Cooper Pilot Opinion Rating Scale was initially published in 1957. After several years of experience gained in its application to many flight and flight simulator experiments, and through its use by the military services and aircraft industry, the scale was modified in collaboration with Robert (Bob) Harper of the Cornell Aeronautical Laboratory (Now Calspan) and was presented to an AGARD Flight Mechanics Panel meeting in 1966. After some further development it became the Cooper-Harper Flying Qualities Rating Scale in 1969, a scale which remains the standard for measuring flying qualities.

=== Awards ===
In recognition of his many contributions to aviation safety, Cooper received the Admiral Luis de Florez Flight Safety Award in 1966 and the Richard Hansford Burroughs, Jr. Test Pilot Award in 1971. After he retired, both he and Bob Harper were selected by the American Institute of Aeronautics and Astronautics to reprise the Cooper-Harper Rating Scale in the 1984 Wright Brothers Lectureship in Aeronautics. Cooper also received the Crystal Eagle award from the Aero Club of Northern California in 1990.

== Scale ==
A Handling Qualities Rating (HQR) can not be assigned to an aircraft, as in "That aircraft is a HQR 5 aircraft." Any HQR that is assigned requires a well defined, repeatable task, a well trained pilot that is actively engaged in accomplishing that task, and an aircraft.

== Other scales ==
While the Cooper–Harper scale remains the only well-established scale for assessing aircraft flying qualities, its unidimensional format lacks diagnostic power and has also been criticised for exhibiting poor reliability. The Cranfield Aircraft Handling Qualities Rating Scale (CAHQRS), developed at Cranfield University's School of Engineering, is a multidimensional evaluative system. It was developed by combining concepts from two previously established scales, the NASA Task Load Index (TLX) workload scale and the Cooper–Harper. A series of validation trials in an engineering flight simulator with a range of control laws showed that the CAHQRS was at least as effective as the Cooper–Harper scale. However, the CAHQRS also demonstrated greater diagnostic ability and reliability than the Cooper–Harper. This new scale's acceptance by the aerospace industry at large, though, remains to be demonstrated.

== See also ==
- Flying qualities
