= C211 =

C211 or variant, may refer to:

== Vehicles ==
- New York City Subway car C211; a crane car, see List of New York City Subway R-type contracts
- Nissan Skyline C211, a coupé sports car
- Siemens Inspiro Class C2.11, electric multiple unit train class
- SpaceX Cargo Dragon C211, a SpaceX Dragon 2 uncrewed cargo carrying space capsule

== Other uses ==
- Casterton–Aspley Road (C211), Victoria, Australia; see List of road routes in Victoria
- Anal intraepithelial neoplasia, grade III (C21.1), see International Classification of Diseases for Oncology
- Adenocarcinoma of anal glands (C21.1), see International Classification of Diseases for Oncology

== See also ==
- 211 (disambiguation)
- C (disambiguation)
