= 211th Brigade =

211th Brigade may refer to:

- 211th Pontoon-Bridge Brigade, Ukraine
- 211th Infantry Brigade, United Kingdom
- 211th Brigade, Royal Field Artillery, United Kingdom

== See also ==
- 211th Division (disambiguation)
- 211th Regiment (disambiguation)
