= 211th Regiment =

211th Regiment may refer to:

- 211th Air Reconnaissance Regiment, Yugoslavia
- 211th Aviation Regiment, United States
- 211th Coast Artillery Regiment, United States
- 211th Infantry Regiment (United States)
- 211th Pennsylvania Infantry Regiment, a Union Army regiment during the American Civil War

== See also ==
- 211th Division (disambiguation)
- 211th (disambiguation)
