= 1/12 =

1/12 may refer to:

- January 12 (month-day date notation)
- December 1 (day-month date notation)
- January 12 AD (month-year date notation)
- 1 AD December (year-month date notation)
- 1st Battalion, 12th Marines, an artillery battalion of the US Marine Corps
- 1/12 or 1:12 scale
- Maximum slope of a wheelchair ramp under regulations in several countries

== See also ==
- 1 (disambiguation)
- 12 (disambiguation)
- 112 (disambiguation)
- 11/2 (disambiguation)
- 12/1 (disambiguation)
- 121 (disambiguation)
- -1/12
