= 12/1 =

12/1 may refer to:

- December 1 (month-day date notation)
- January 12 (day-month date notation)
- January 12 AD (month-year date notation)
- 1 AD December (year-month date notation)

== See also ==
- 121 (disambiguation)
- 1/12 (disambiguation)
- 112 (disambiguation)
- 12 (disambiguation)
- 1 (disambiguation)
