= Roll Out Solar Array =

Spacecraft solar panels

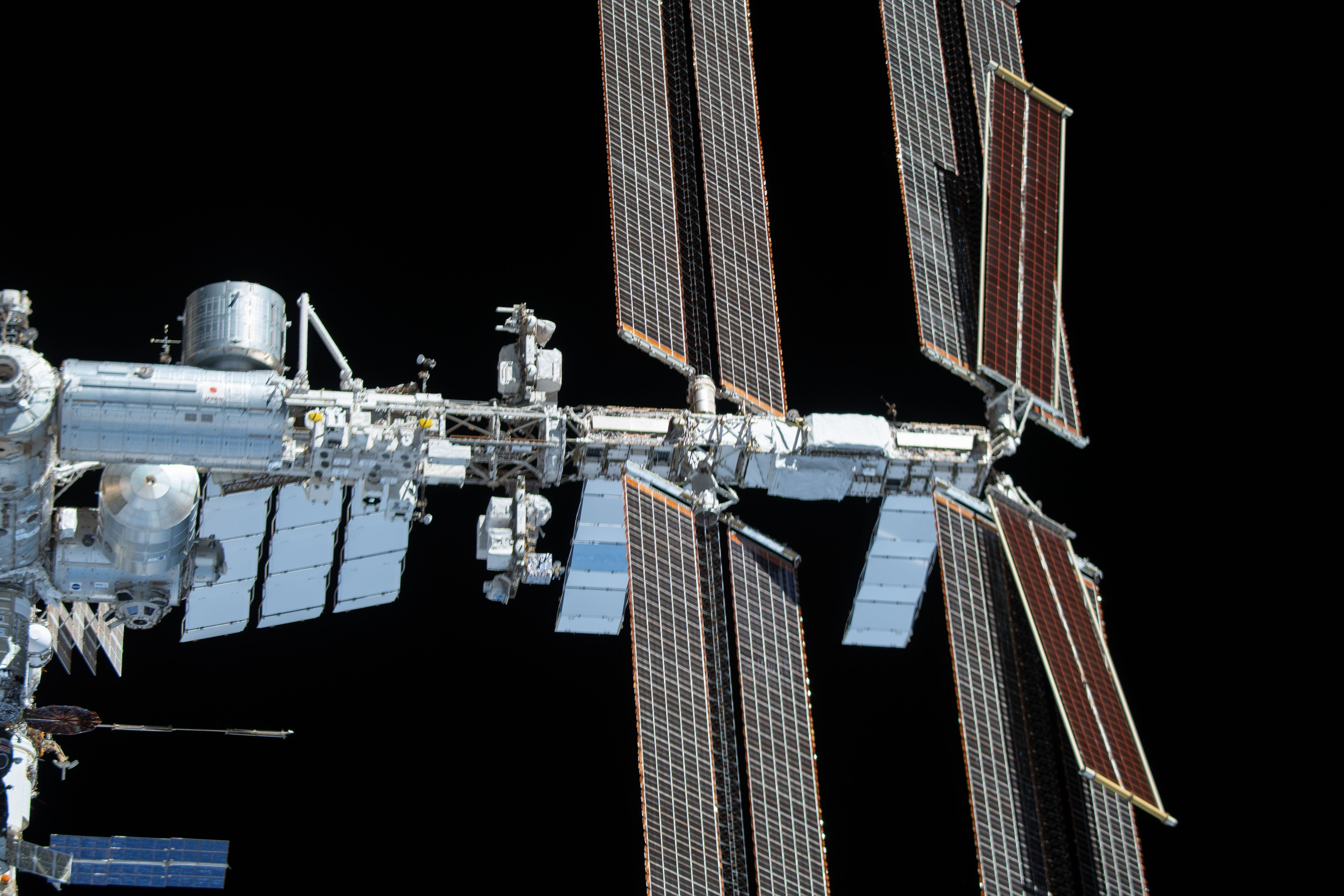
iRosa panels photographed during SpaceX Crew-2 flyaround

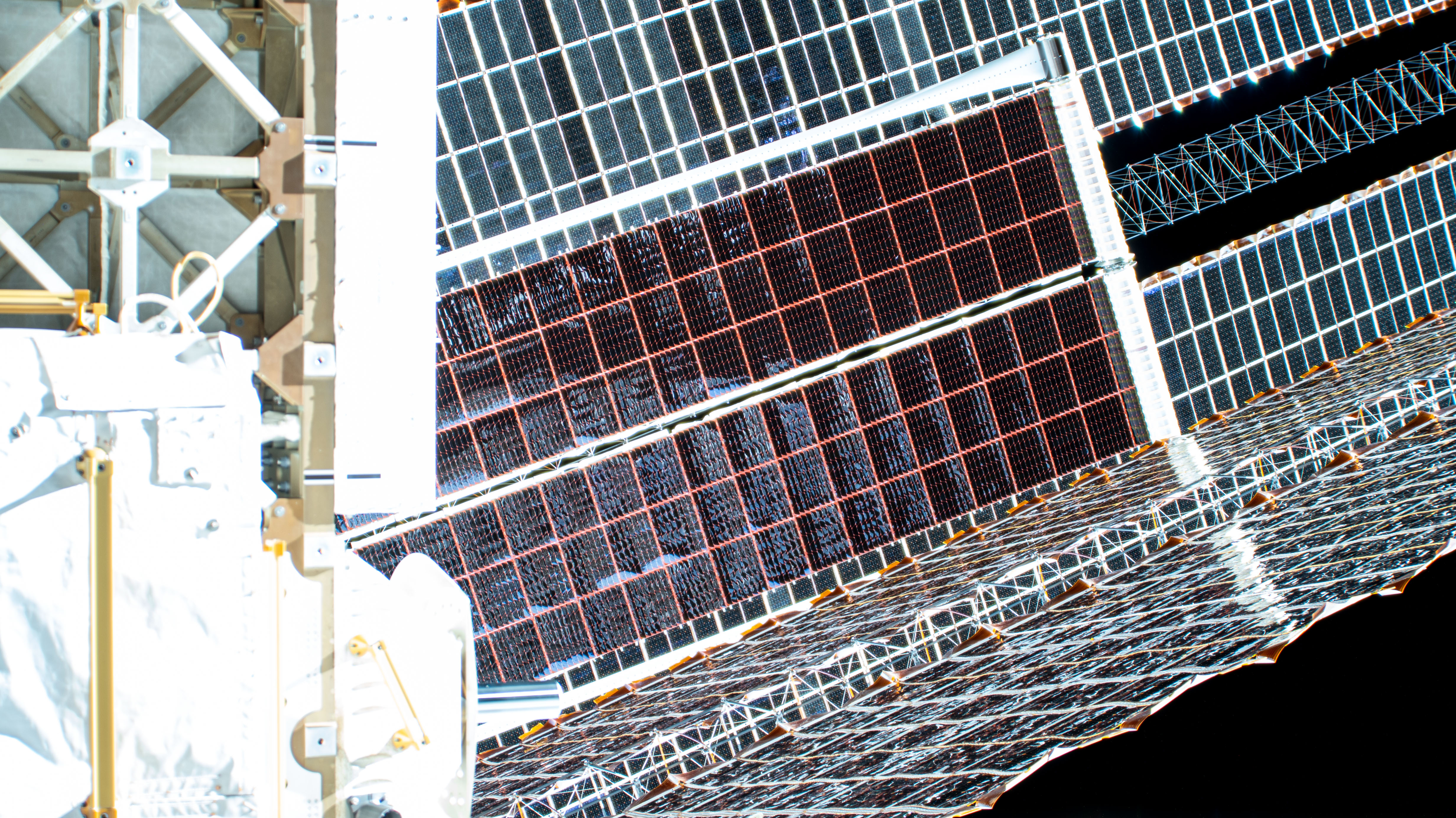
Newly deployed iROSA panel as seen from a zoom camera on the P6 Truss

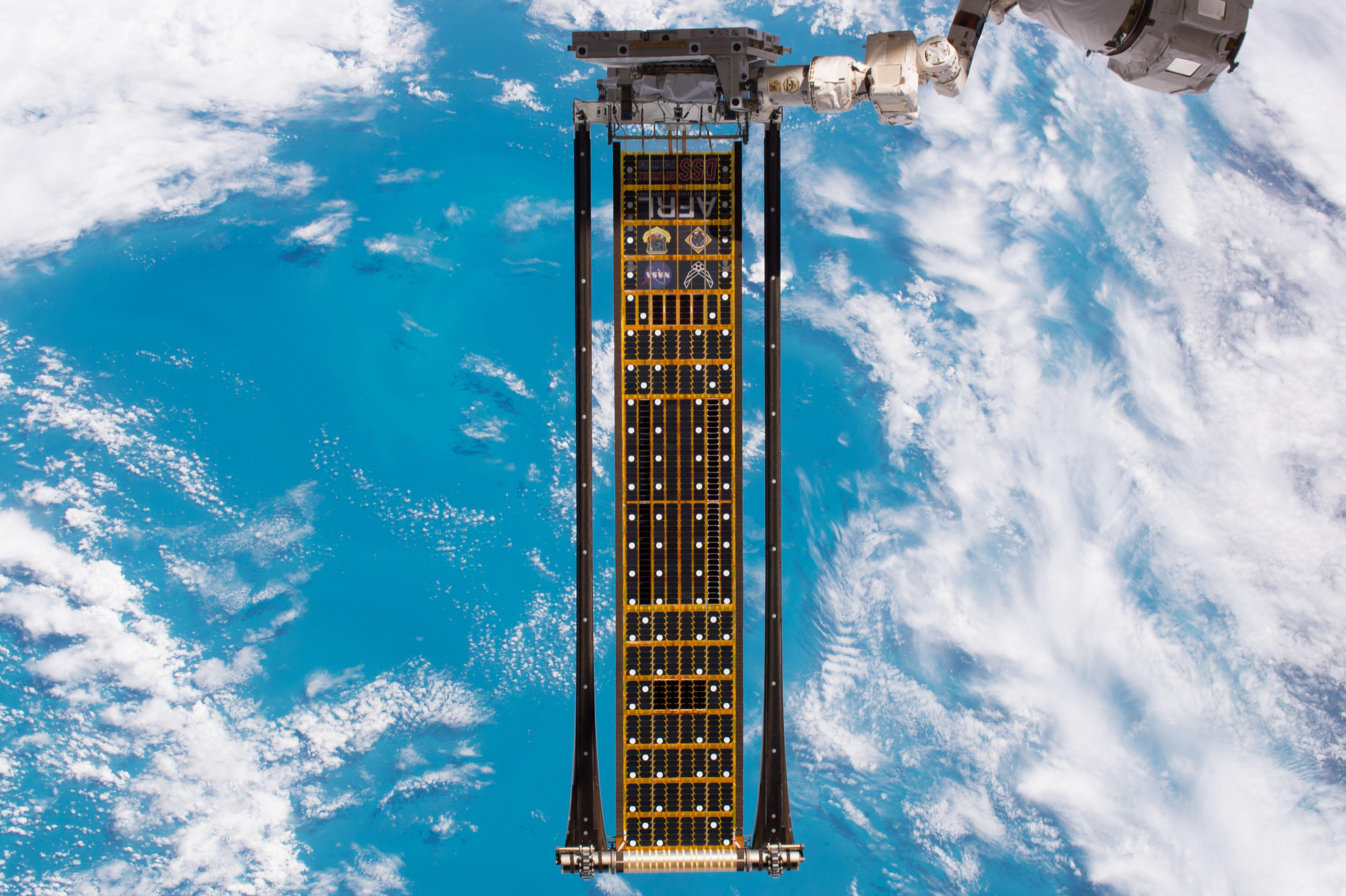
ROSA held by the robotic arms at the International Space Station

The Roll Out Solar Array (ROSA) and its larger version ISS Roll Out Solar Array (iROSA) are lightweight, flexible power sources for spacecraft designed and developed by Redwire.

This new type of solar array provides much more energy than traditional solar arrays at much less mass. Traditional solar panels used to power satellites are bulky, with heavy panels folded together using mechanical hinges. Given a space-bound payload is limited in its mass and volume by necessity, ROSA is 20 percent lighter (with a mass of 325 kg (717 lb)) and one-fourth the volume of rigid panel arrays with the same performance.

ROSA is a flexible and rollable solar array that operates the same way a measuring tape unwinds on its spool. The new solar array design rolls up to form a compact cylinder for launch with significantly less mass and volume, potentially offering substantial cost savings as well as an increase in power for satellites. ROSA has a center wing made of a flexible material which support the strings of photovoltaic cells that produce electricity. Both the sides of the wing have a narrow arm that extends through the length of the wing to provide support to the array, called a high strain composite boom. The booms look like split tubes made of a stiff composite material, flattened and rolled up lengthwise. The array does not need any motor to unfurl. This is achieved using the potential energy stored in the booms that is released as each boom transitions from a coil shape to a straight support arm. The solar wings are then deployed due to strain energy in rolled booms that are present at the two ends of the structure.

== Patent ==
Brian R. Spence and Stephen F. White were the first persons to patent the idea of the Roll Out Solar Array on January 21, 2010. They received a patent for this work on April 1, 2014.

== History on ISS ==
=== ROSA test mission ===
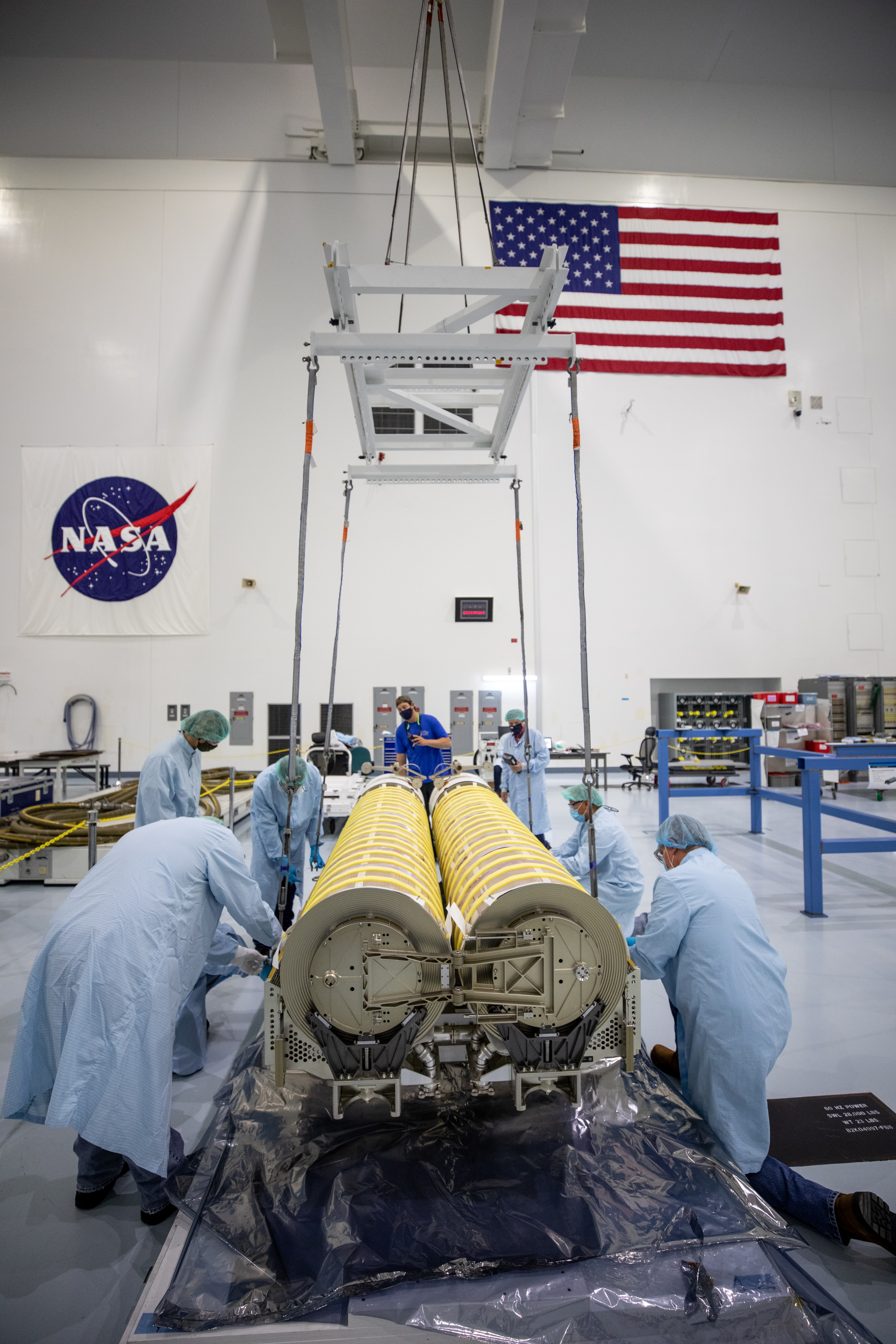
ISS roll out solar arrays being made in the Space Station Processing Facility at KSC

NASA tested the ROSA technology in vacuum chambers on Earth throughout the 2010s and, satisfied by the promising results, commenced to test it in space on June 18 of 2017. ROSA launched aboard SpaceX CRS-11 on 3 June. Over the weekend of June 17–18, 2017, engineers on the ground remotely operated the International Space Station's robotic Canadarm2 to extract the Roll Out Solar Array (ROSA) experiment from the SpaceX Dragon resupply ship. After the observation the mechanism was not planned to be retrieved back to earth. The solar array unfurled June 18, extending by tensioning booms on both sides of the 1.6-meter-wide wing. NASA decided to conduct continuous tests for a week and observe its consequences. Engineers observed the behavior of the solar array as it was exposed to extreme temperature swings through the ISS's orbit. Vibrations and oscillations were also mechanically introduced to assess the array's response to structural loads. Subsequent to the experiments, ground controllers were unable to lock the solar panel in its stowed configuration. The solar array was therefore jettisoned from the International Space Station on June 30, following the 12-day test.

=== iROSA 2B/4B ===
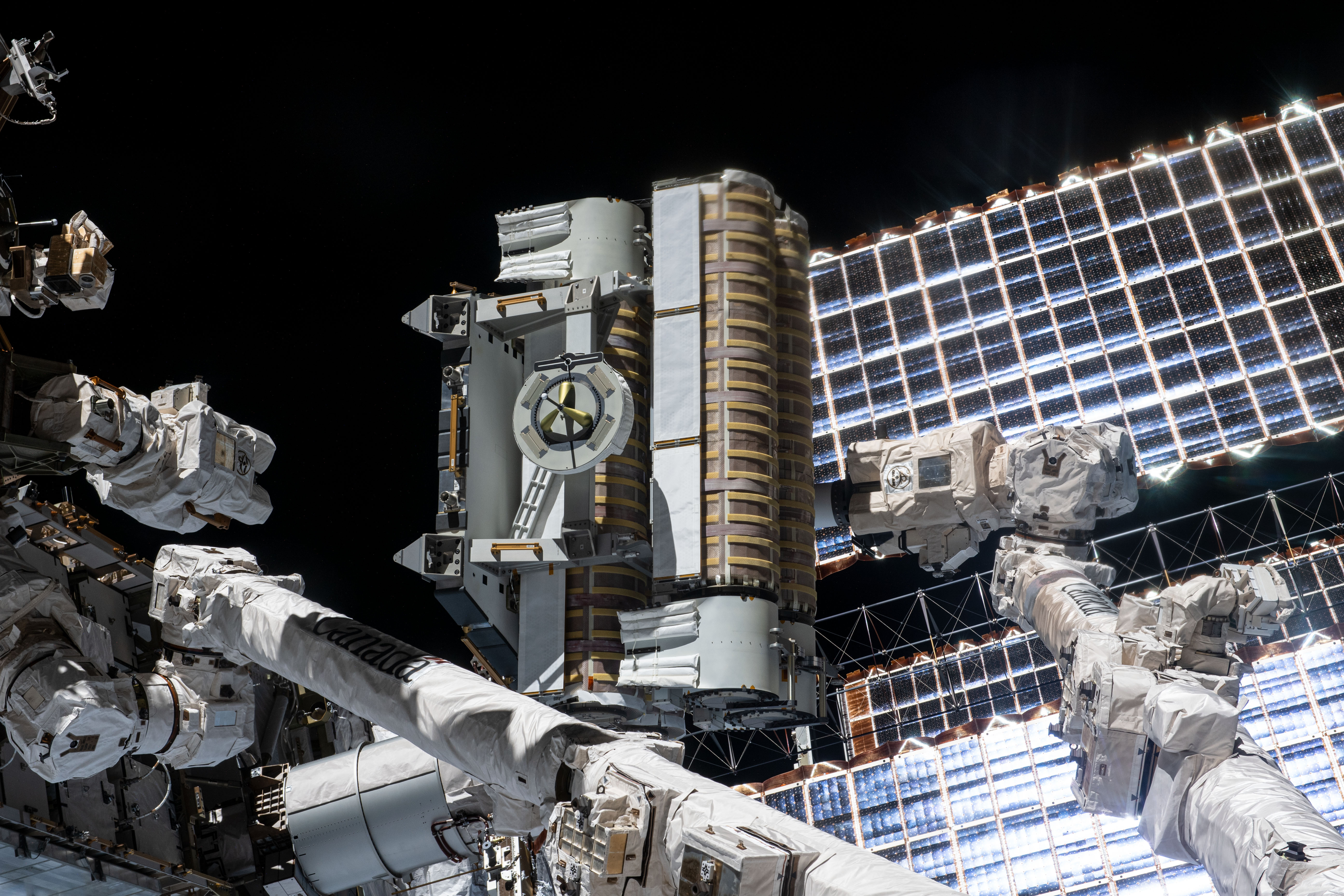
ISS-65 An iROSA in the grip of the Canadarm2 robotic arm

In June 2021, two new solar iROSA panels were installed on the International Space Station's P6 truss mast cans. The two operations took six hours each to complete and were carried out on three spacewalks by astronauts Shane Kimbrough and Thomas Pesquet. The new arrays were intended to give the station a total of 120 kilowatts of additional augmented power during daytime orbit.

=== iROSA 3A/4A ===
On 3 December 2022, Expedition 68 crew members Josh Cassada and Frank Rubio installed an iROSA at Array 3A on the S4 truss segment and connected it to the US power system. The spacewalkers undid bolts and installed cables and at 17:37 GMT the array was deployed and is receiving power. As part of get-ahead tasks, they prepared the 4A array on the P4 truss segment for the next spacewalk, demated the 1B array on the S6 segment, broke torque on the P4 electronics boxes, and installed cables along the truss to be mated at the end of the fifth spacewalk of the expedition. The spacewalk faced a delay when Cassada's suit did not power up. Troubleshooting steps were carried out and power was restored to Cassada's suit so they could continue the spacewalk. Nick Hague was ground support communicator for the spacewalk. On 22 December 2022, during Cassada and Rubio's next spacewalk, the other iROSA was installed on top of the old 4A solar array.

=== iROSA 1A/1B ===
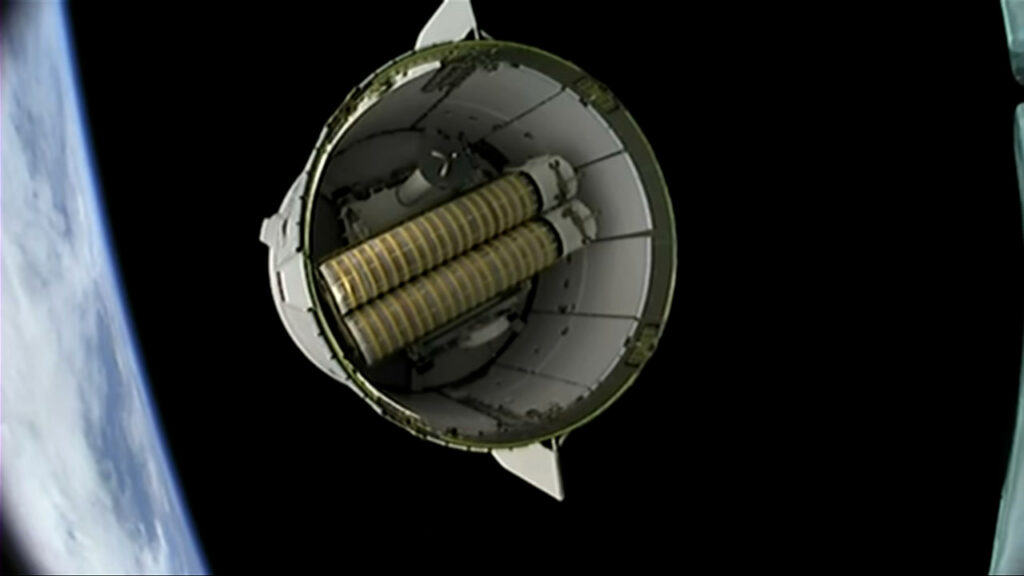
iROSA in Dragon trunk as viewed from upper stage of Falcon 9

On 9 June 2023, NASA astronauts Steve Bowen and Warren Hoburg exited the station’s Quest airlock and installed an upgraded iROSA on the 1A power channel on the S4 truss section of the station. Bowen and Hoburg removed bolts, deployed the rollers, and installed cables before Hoburg picked up the solar array with assistance from Canadarm2. The two astronauts then installed it on the 1A solar array on the S4 Truss. The array was deployed at 16:32 UTC and was reported to be receiving power. On 15 June 2023, during Bowen and Hoburg's next spacewalk, the other iROSA was installed on top of the old 1B solar array on the S6 truss section.

=== iROSA 2A/3B ===
The final set of iROSAs, the seventh and eighth, were sent to the ISS for augmenting the 2A and 3B power channels on the P4 and S6 truss segments in 2026, with preparatory work by Expedition 74 spacewalkers Jessica Meir and Christopher Williams having begun in mid-March. NASA announced that they were aiming to launch the final set of iROSAs in fall 2026, aboard SpaceX CRS-35. After the Dragon spacecraft successfully launched, on 29 October and 5 November, Expedition 75 spacewalkers Anil Menon and Joshua Kutryk installed the set.

== Applications ==
Over time, the photovoltaic cells on the ISS' existing Solar Array Wings on the Integrated Truss Structure have degraded gradually, having been designed for a 15-year service life. This is especially noticeable with the first arrays to launch, with the P6 and P4 Trusses in 2000 and 2006.

To augment the wings, four pairs of scaled-up versions known as iROSA launched in the trunks of the SpaceX Dragon 2 cargo version from early June 2021 to mid-October 2026, aboard SpaceX CRS-22, CRS-26, CRS-28, and CRS-35. These arrays, half the width of the existing wings, are intended to be deployed along the central part of the wings between half and two-thirds of their length, and their planes are canted at a 10° angle above the plane of the existing solar array wings.

Work to install iROSA's support brackets on the P6 truss mast cans holding the Solar Array Wings was initiated by the crew members of Expedition 64 in late February 2021. After the first pair of arrays were delivered in early June, a spacewalk on 16 June by members Shane Kimbrough and Thomas Pesquet of Expedition 65 to place one iROSA array on the 2B power channel and mast can of the P6 truss was successful until a spacesuit computer malfunctioned and the iROSA encountered technical problems with deployment, resulting in the spacewalk being cut short early, having lasted 7 hours and 15 minutes. Two more spacewalks, on 20 and 25 June and lasting between 6 hours 28 minutes and 6 hours 45 minutes, saw Kimbrough and Pesquet complete the first iROSA's deployment as well as the installation and deployment of the second iROSA on the 4B power channel and mast can.

The second pair of iROSA assemblies were installed later with one of them on the P4 Truss. Astronauts Akihiko Hoshide and Mark Vande Hei of Expedition 65 were slated to carry out the preceding bracket installation on 24 August 2021. It was postponed to September after Vande Hei encountered "minor medical issues". He was replaced by Thomas Pesquet. The spacewalk began on 12 September 2021 and lasted 6 hours and 45 minutes. The second pair of arrays were launched aboard SpaceX CRS-26 on 26 November 2022. On 3 December 2022, Expedition 68 crew members Josh Cassada and Frank Rubio began a spacewalk to install the arrays at their final locations, at the 3A power channel and mast can on the S4 segment, and the 4A power channel and mast can on the P4 segment. They completed the installation on 22 December.

The third pair of arrays were launched aboard SpaceX CRS-28 on 5 June 2023. On 9 June 2023, Expedition 69 crew members Stephen Bowen and Warren Hoburg began a spacewalk to install the arrays at their final locations, at the 1A power channel and mast can on the S4 segment, and at the 1B power channel and mast can on the S6 segment. They completed the installation on 15 June.

The last pair of iROSAs, the seventh and eighth, were installed on the 2A and 3B power channels on the P4 and S6 truss segments on 29 October and 5 November 2026 by Expedition 75 crew members Anil Menon and Joshua Kutryk. Installing the 2A channel's iROSA bracket was carried out by Jessica Meir and Christopher Williams of Expedition 74 on 18 March 2026.

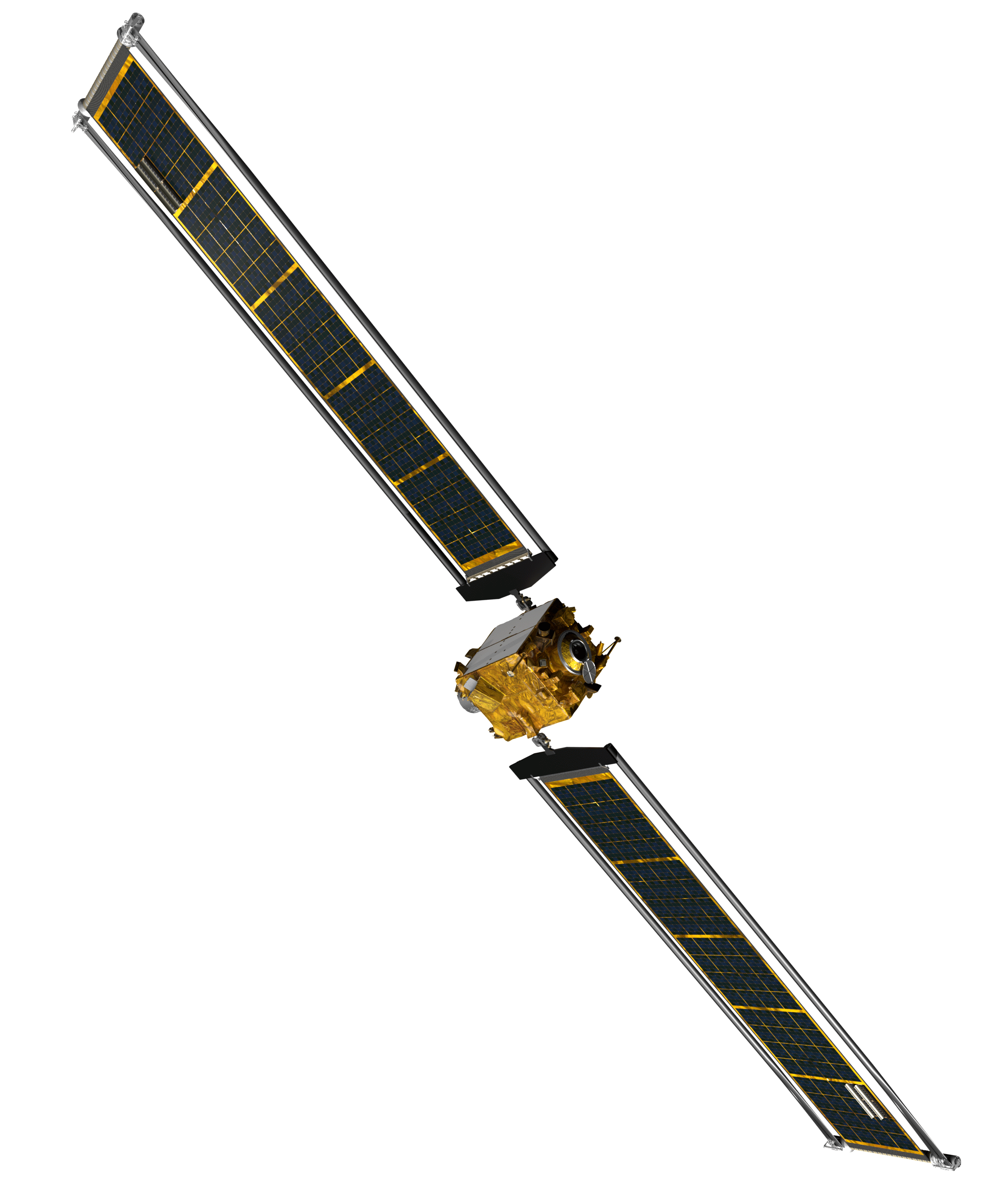
DART satellite showing its ROSA fully deployed

The Power and Propulsion Element of Lunar Gateway and the Double Asteroid Redirection Test (DART) mission used ROSA technology to power its solar electric propulsion.

The ROSA on DART enabled the spacecraft to navigate through space and reach the Didymos asteroid system. The flexible and rollable modular wings were lighter, more compact and stiffer in space and smaller than iROSA. Each array slowly unfurled to reach 28 feet (8.53 m) in length. DART was the first probe to fly the new arrays, paving the way for their use on future missions. Redwire delivered ROSA to APL in May 2021 and worked closely with the APL team for some weeks to carefully install them onto the spacecraft. The installation was completed on 13 August 2021.

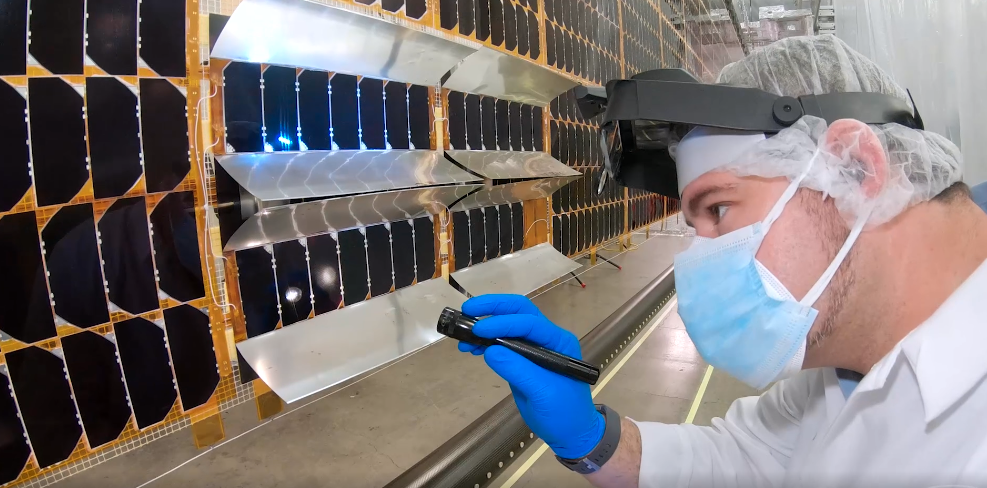
Transformational Solar Array experiment on DART's Roll Out Solar Array (ROSA)

A small portion of each DART solar array is configured to demonstrate Transformational Solar Array technology, which has very-high-efficiency SolAero Inverted Metamorphic Multijunction (IMM) solar cells and reflective concentrators providing three times more power than current solar array technology.

This ROSA technology was later extended for commercial applications, first customer being Ovzon. Their satellite was Maxar Technologies-built Ovzon-3 that was successfully launched on a Falcon 9 rocket on 3 January 2024 to a Geostationary transfer orbit. Later, the solar arrays were deployed on 10 January 2024.

== Missions ==
CRS-11

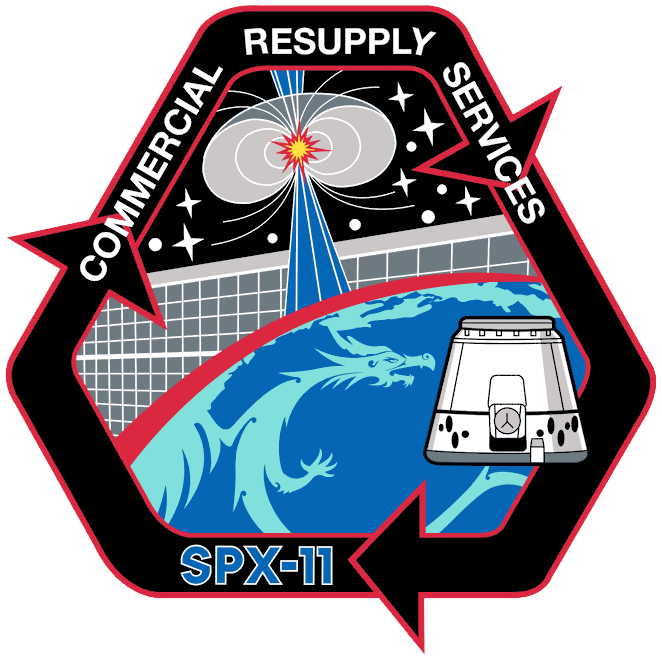
SpaceX CRS-11 mission patch (Note: ROSA test mission)

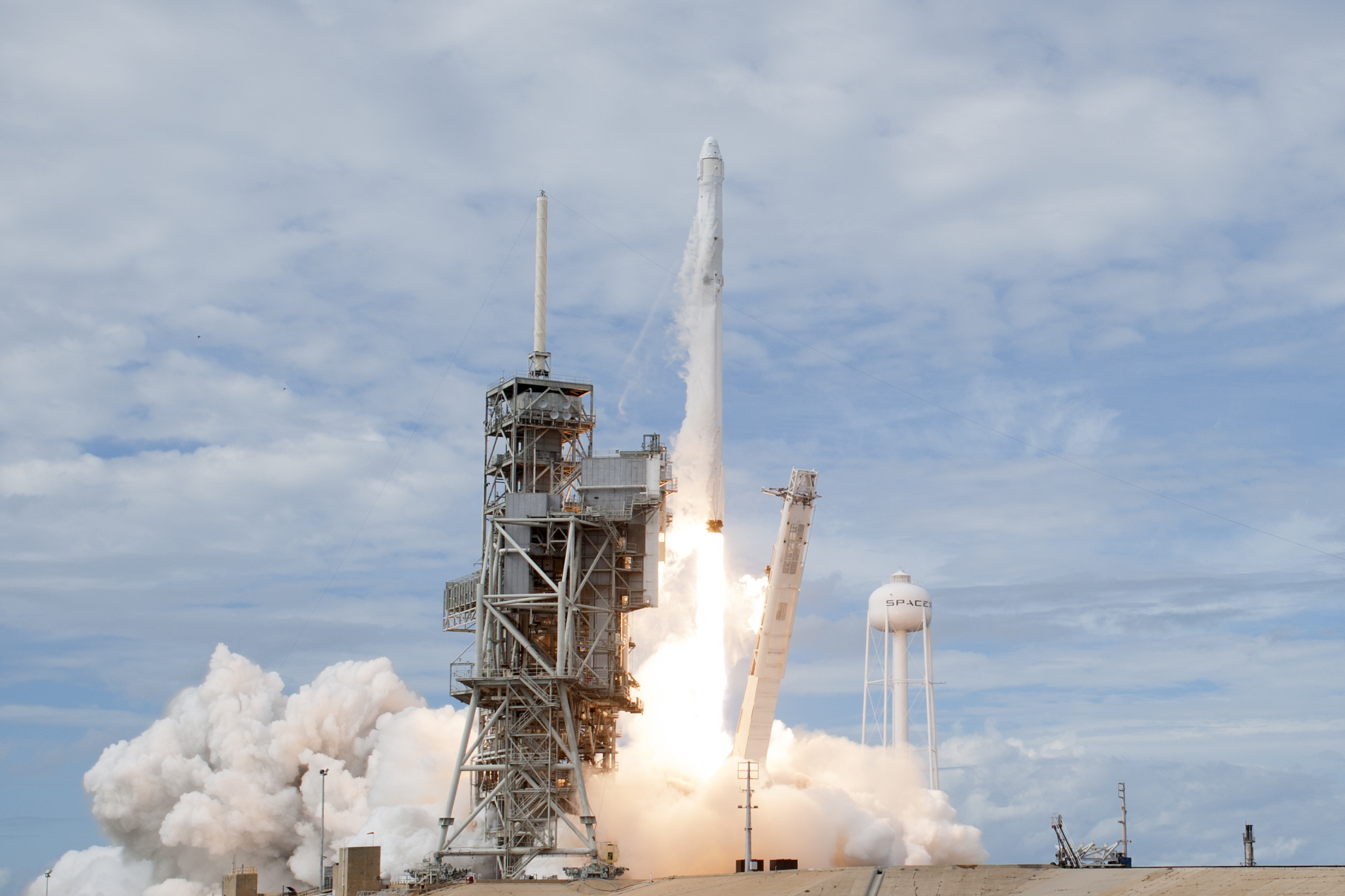
CRS-11 Launch

CRS-22

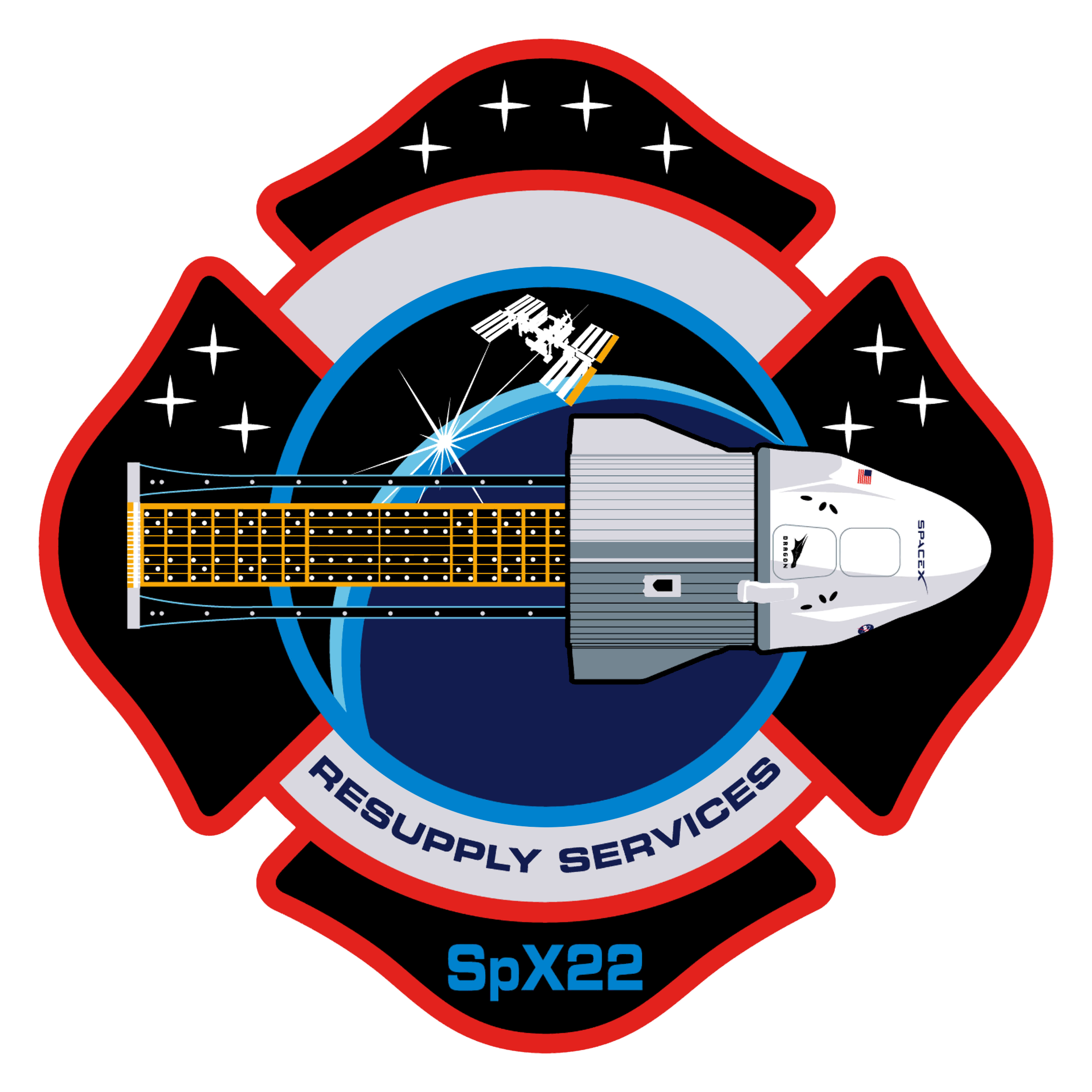
SpaceX CRS-22 Patch (Note: 1st iROSA Mission)

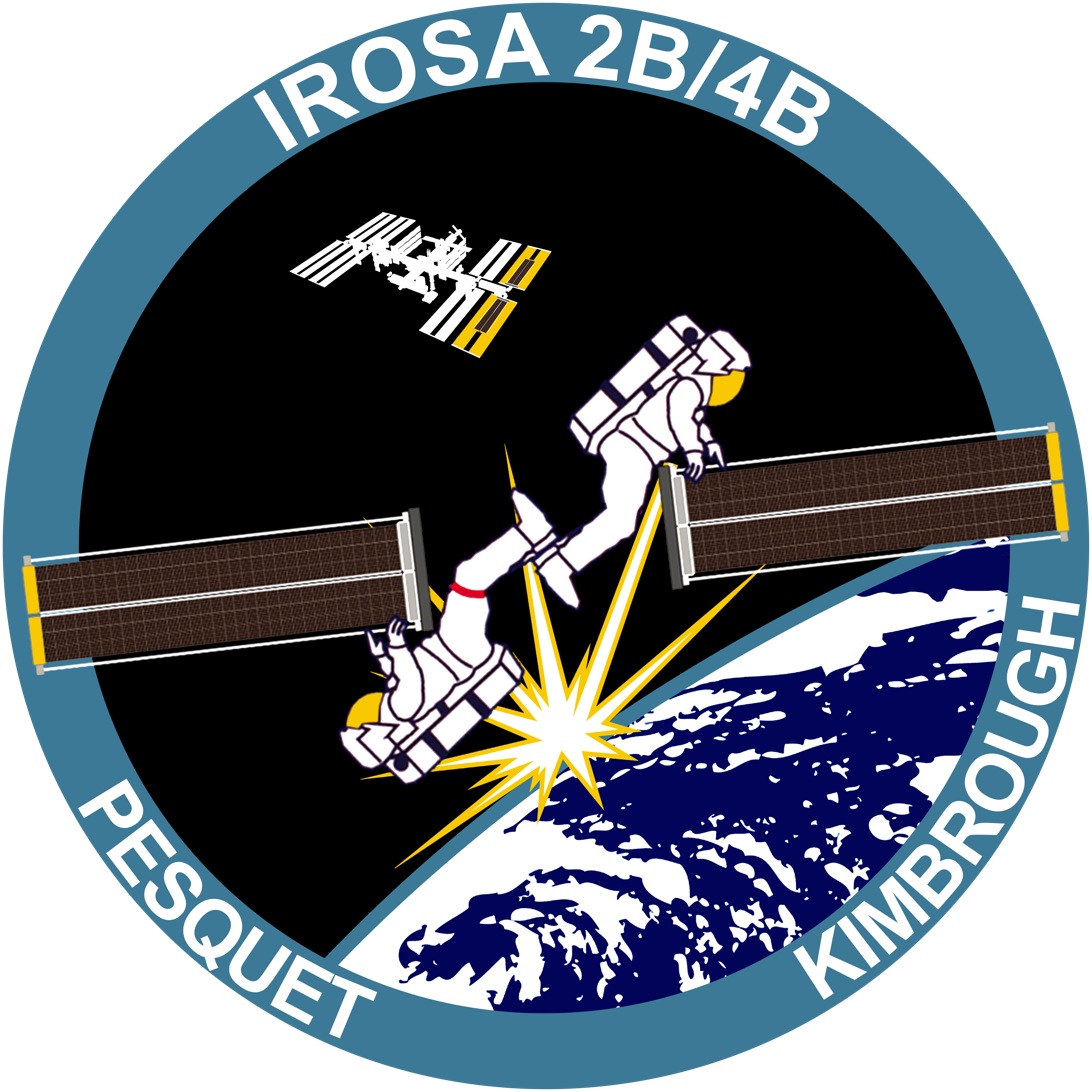
ISS iROSA 2B and 4B patch mission patch

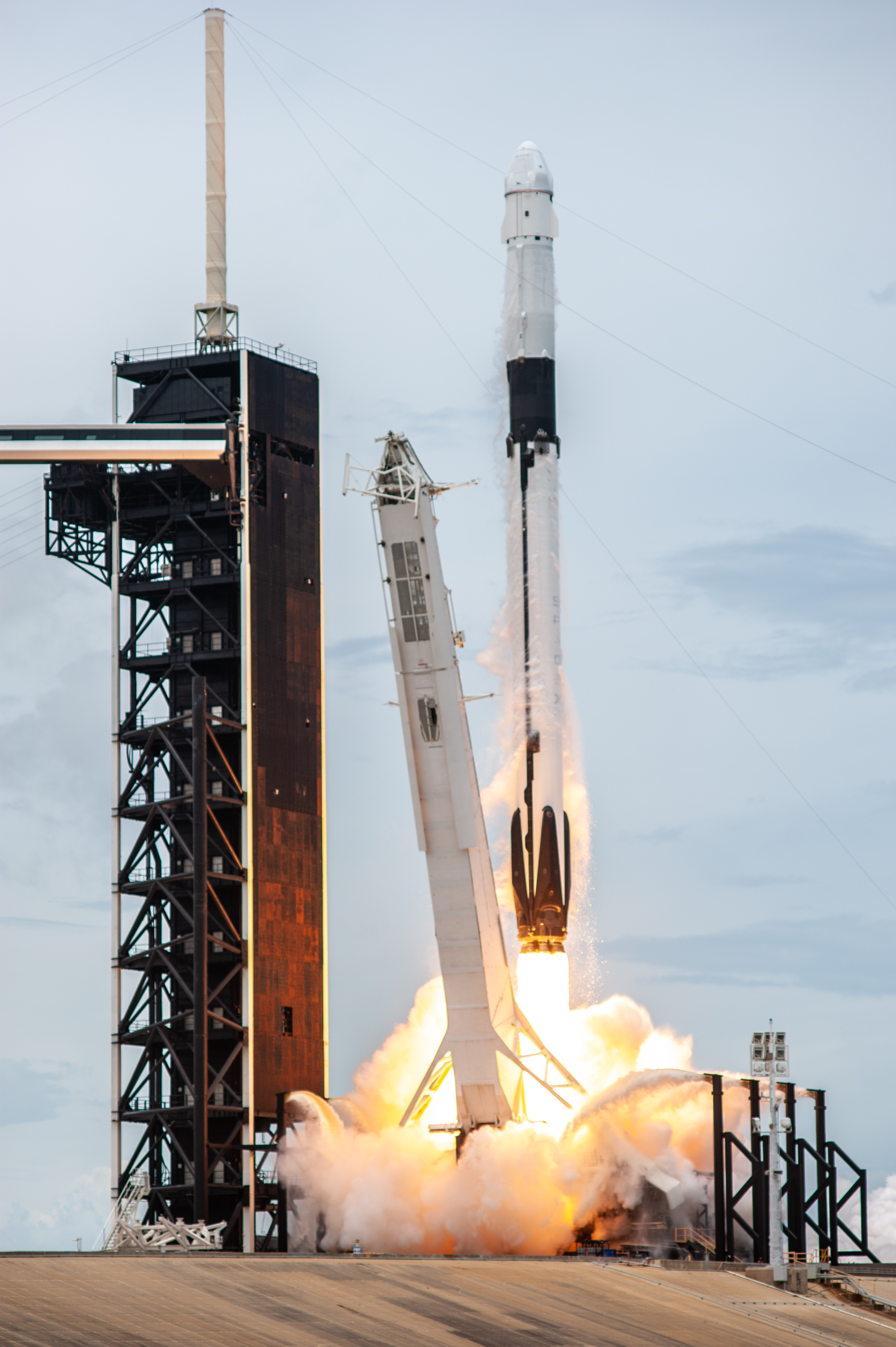
CRS-22 launch

Double Asteroid Redirection Test

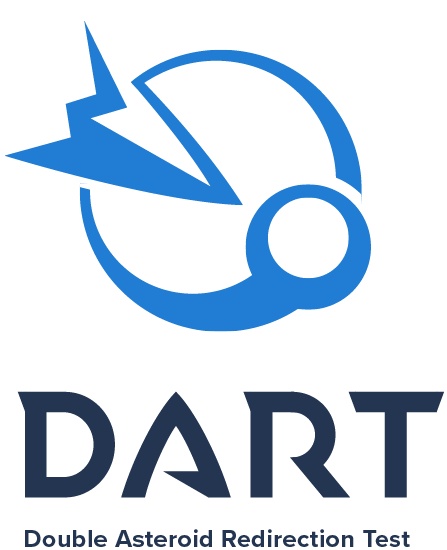
Dart Mission patch (Note: 1st heliocentric mission by ROSA and test mission of Transformational Solar Array)

DART's Roll Out Solar Array (ROSA) development

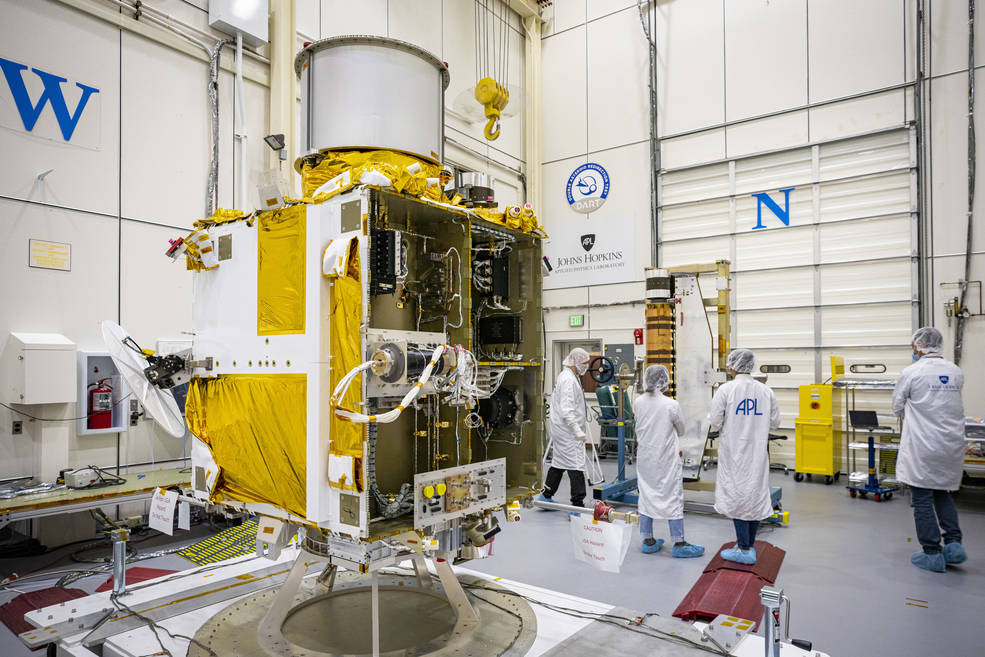
ROSA ready to be installed on DART spacecraft

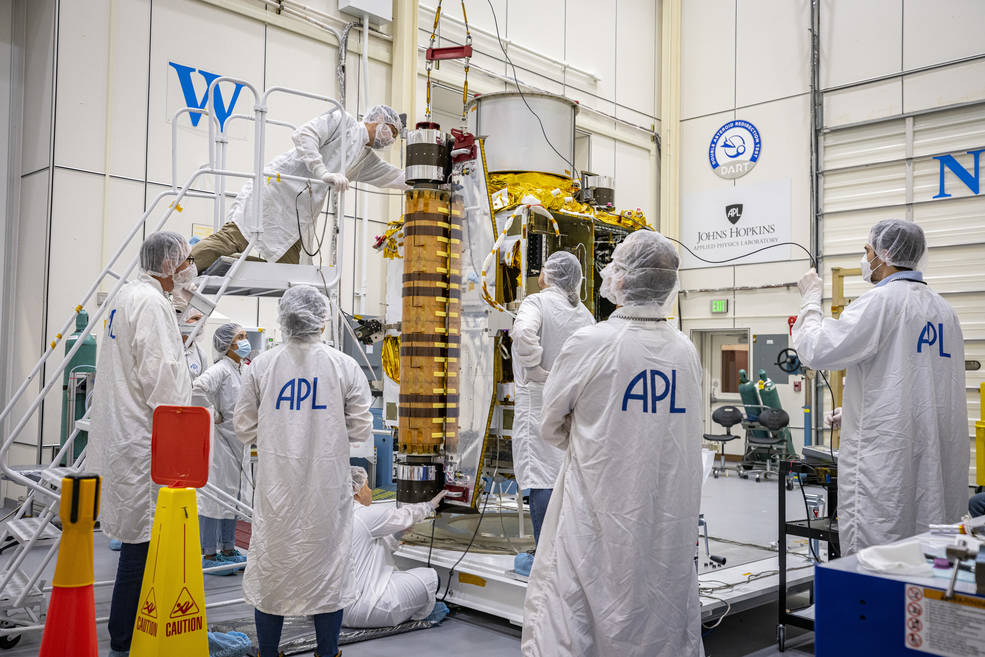
Roll-Out Solar Arrays (ROSA) being installed on DART

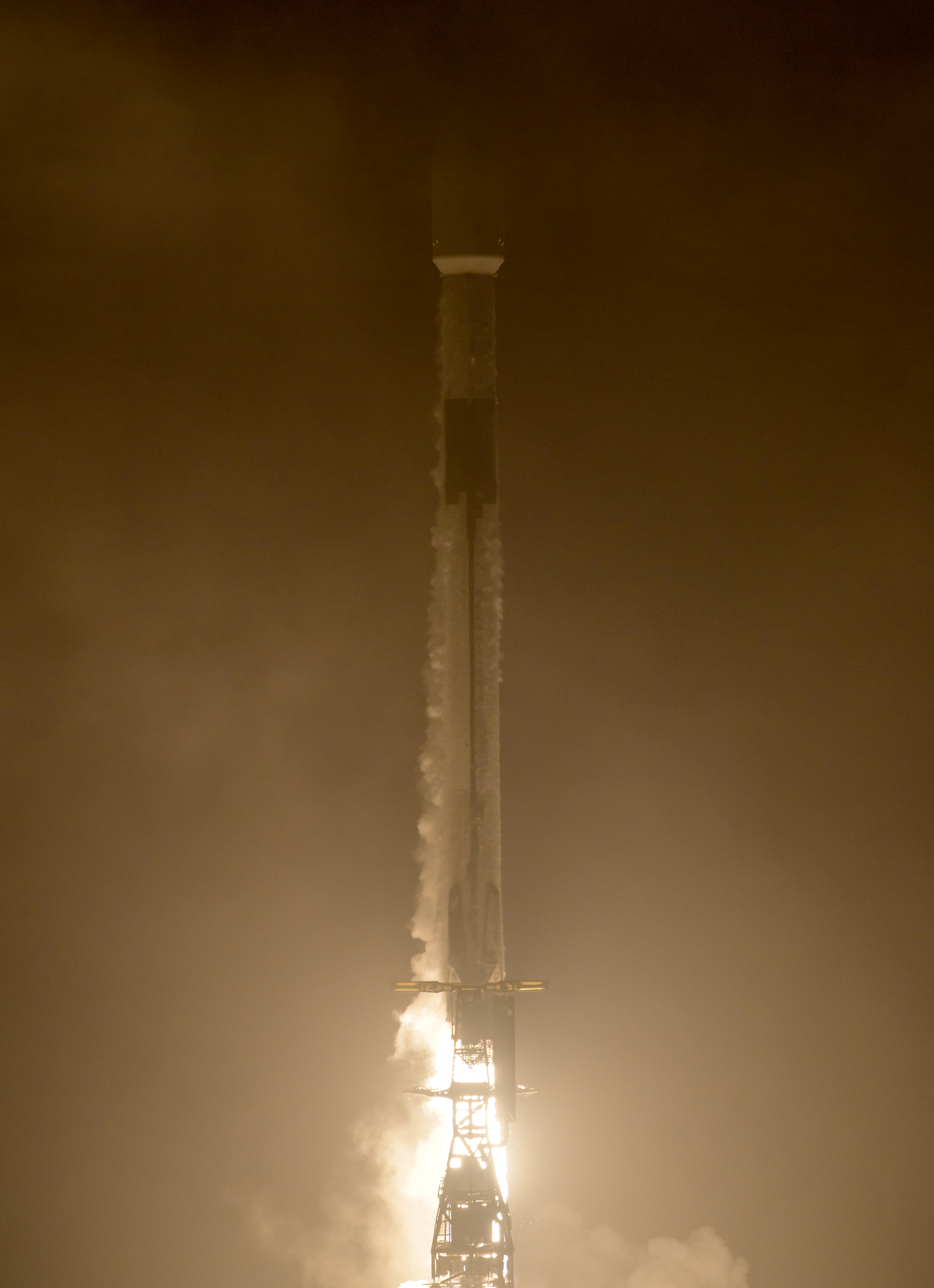
Dart Launch

CRS-26

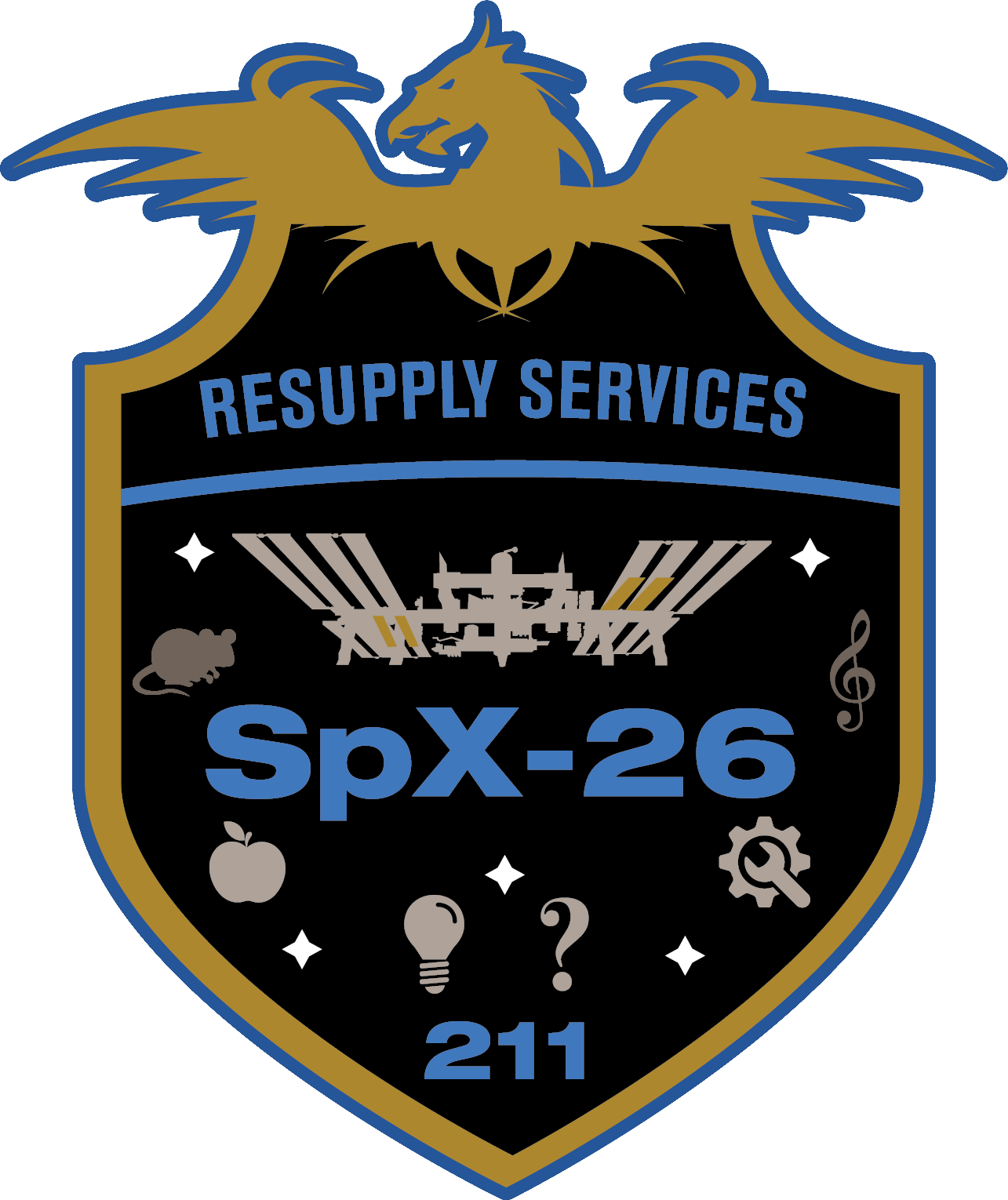
SpaceX CRS-26 mission patch

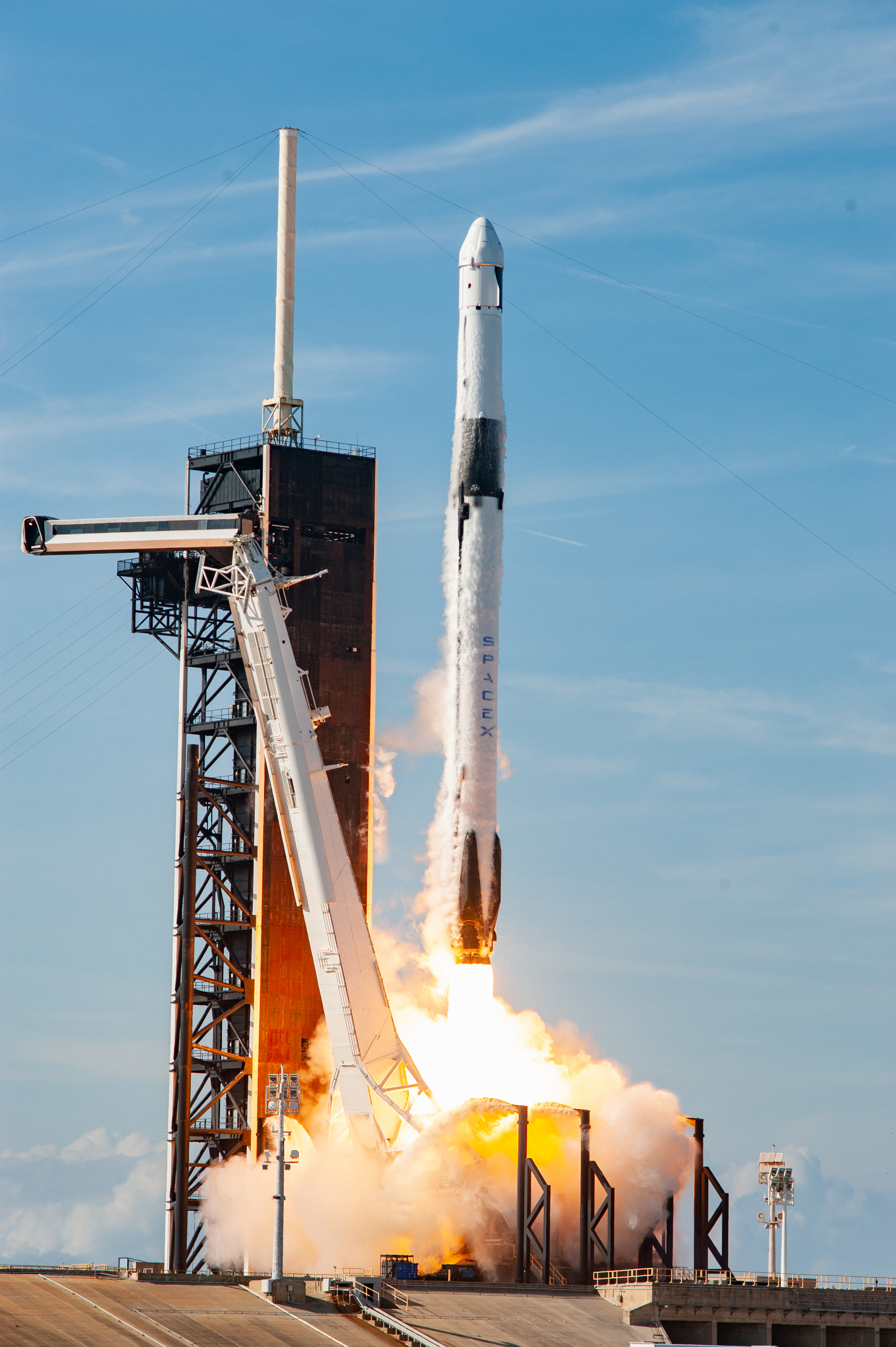
CRS-26 Launch

CRS-28

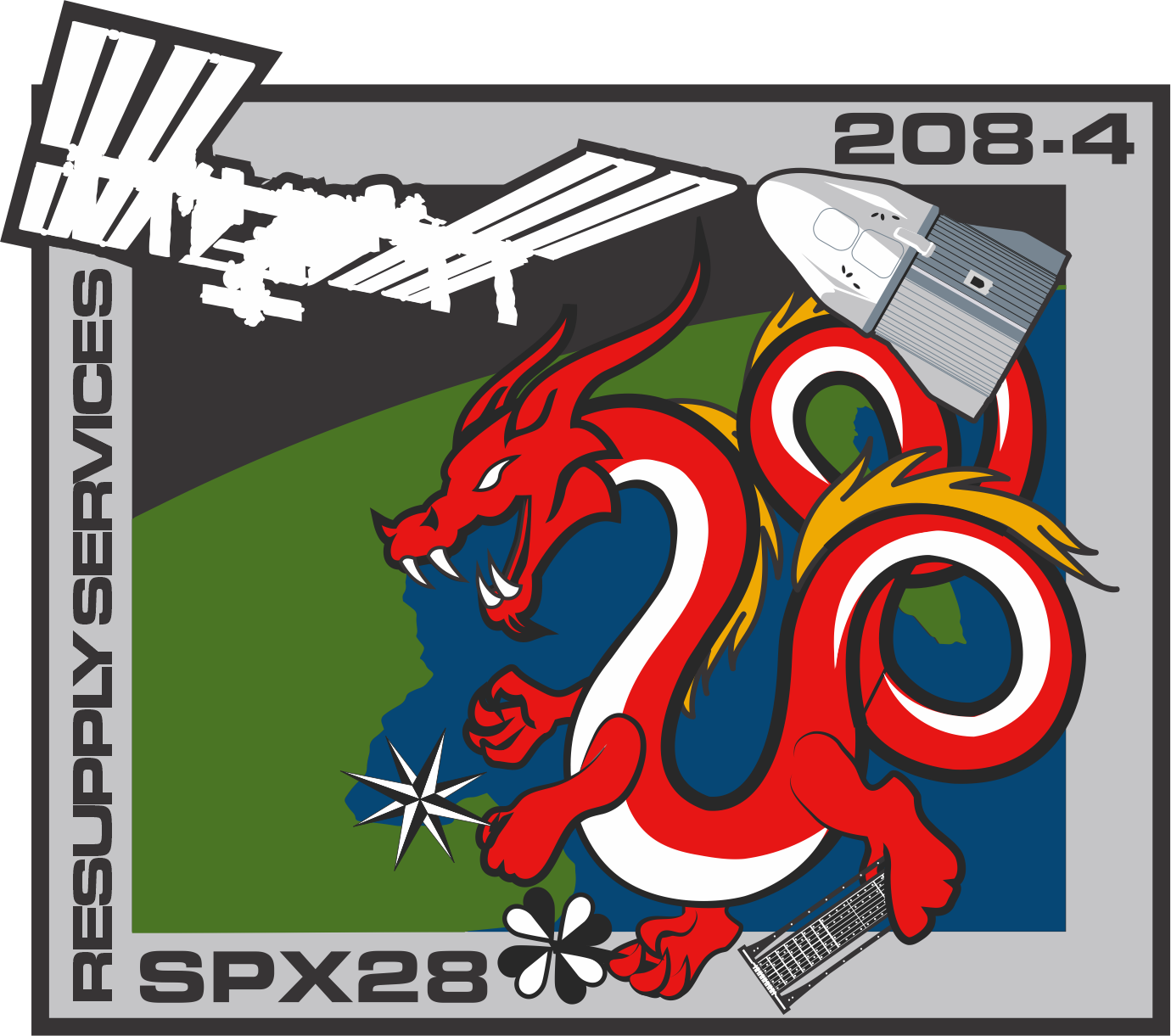
SpaceX CRS-28 mission patch

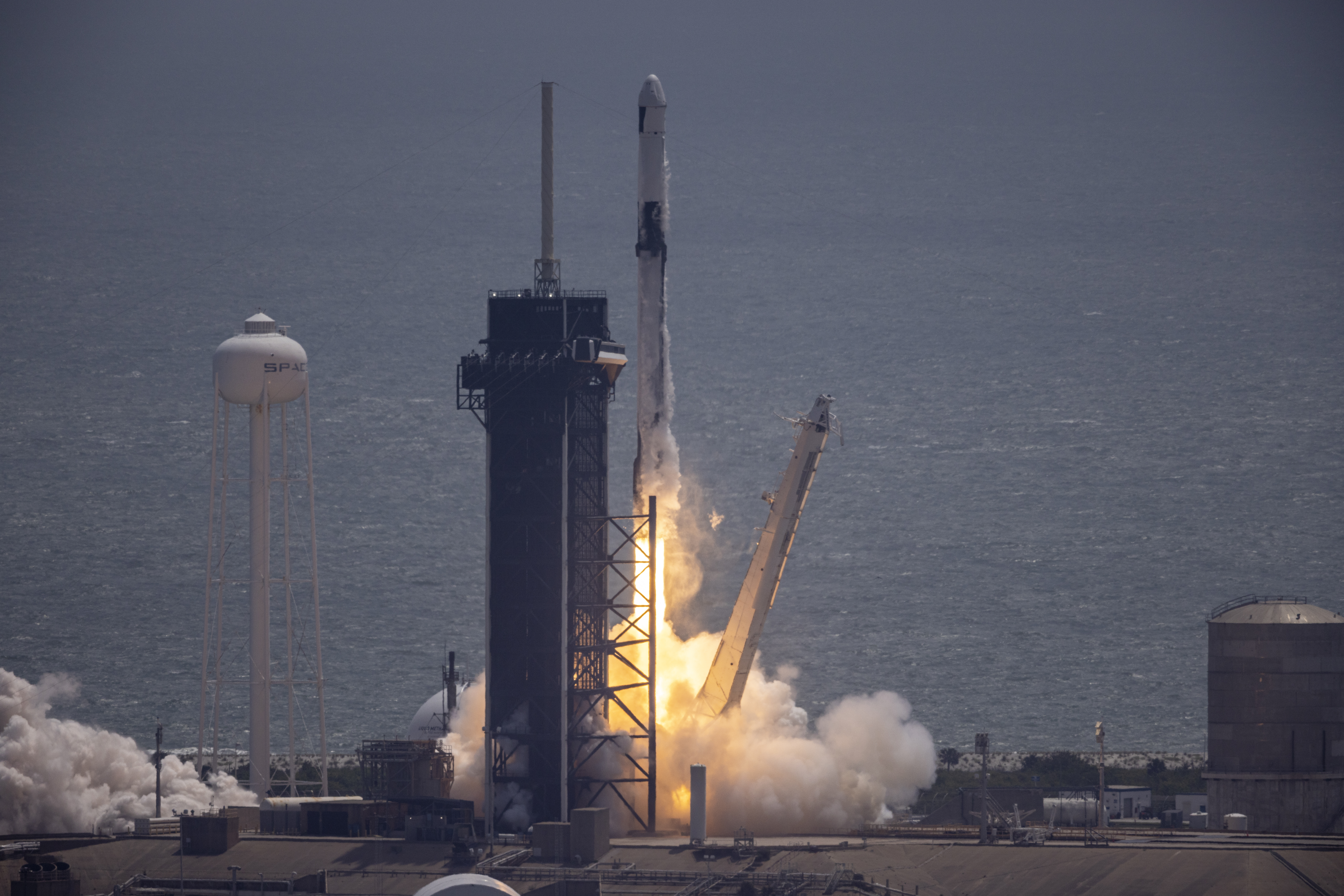
CRS-28 Launch

Ovzon-3

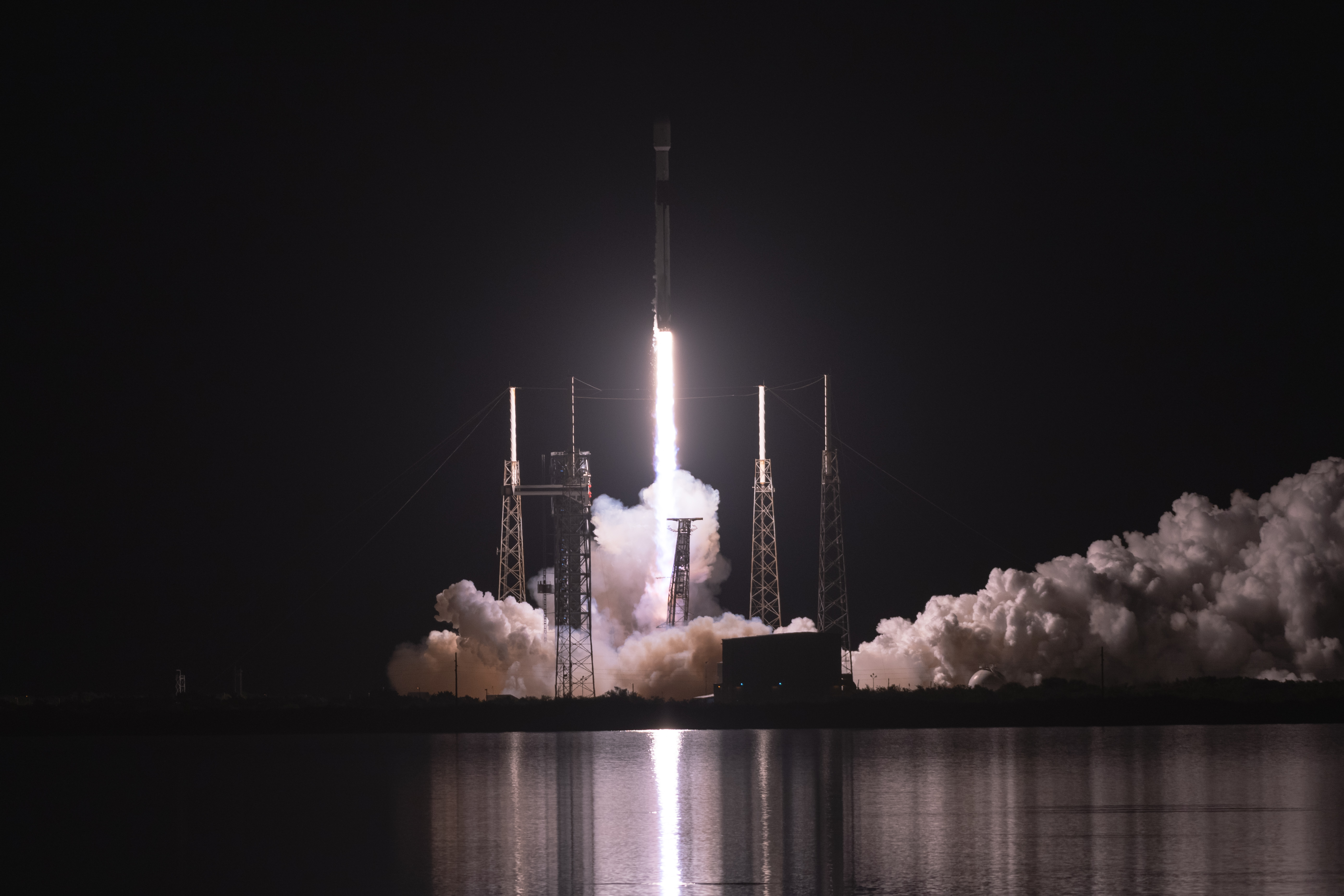
Ovzon-3 Launch

CRS-35

SpaceX CRS-35 mission patch

CRS-35 launch

== See also ==
- Solar panels
- Solar array
- Electrical system of the International Space Station
- Redwire
