= 11/2 =

11/2 may refer to:

- November 2 (month-day date notation)
- February 11 (day-month date notation)
- February 11 AD (month-year date notation)
- 2 AD November (year-month date notation)
- 11 shillings and 2 pence in UK predecimal currency
- A type of hendecagram

== See also ==
- 11 (disambiguation)
- 2 (disambiguation)
- 112 (disambiguation)
- 2/11 (disambiguation)
- 211 (disambiguation)
- 1/12 (disambiguation)
