= 2/11 =

2/11 may refer to:

- February 11 (month-day date notation)
- November 2 (day-month date notation)
- February 11 AD (month-year date notation)
- 2 AD November (year-month date notation)
- 2nd Battalion, 11th Marines, an artillery battalion of the United States Marine Corps

== See also ==
- 11 (disambiguation)
- 2 (disambiguation)
- 211 (disambiguation)
- 11/2 (disambiguation)
- 112 (disambiguation)
