= 211th Division =

211th Division may refer to:

- 211th Division (People's Republic of China)
- 211th Infantry Division (Wehrmacht), Germany
- 211th Coastal Division, Italy
- 211th Rifle Division, Soviet Union

== See also ==
- List of military divisions by number
- 211th Regiment (disambiguation)
- 211th (disambiguation)
