= SpaceX CRS-33 =

Fall 2025 cargo resupply mission to the International Space Station

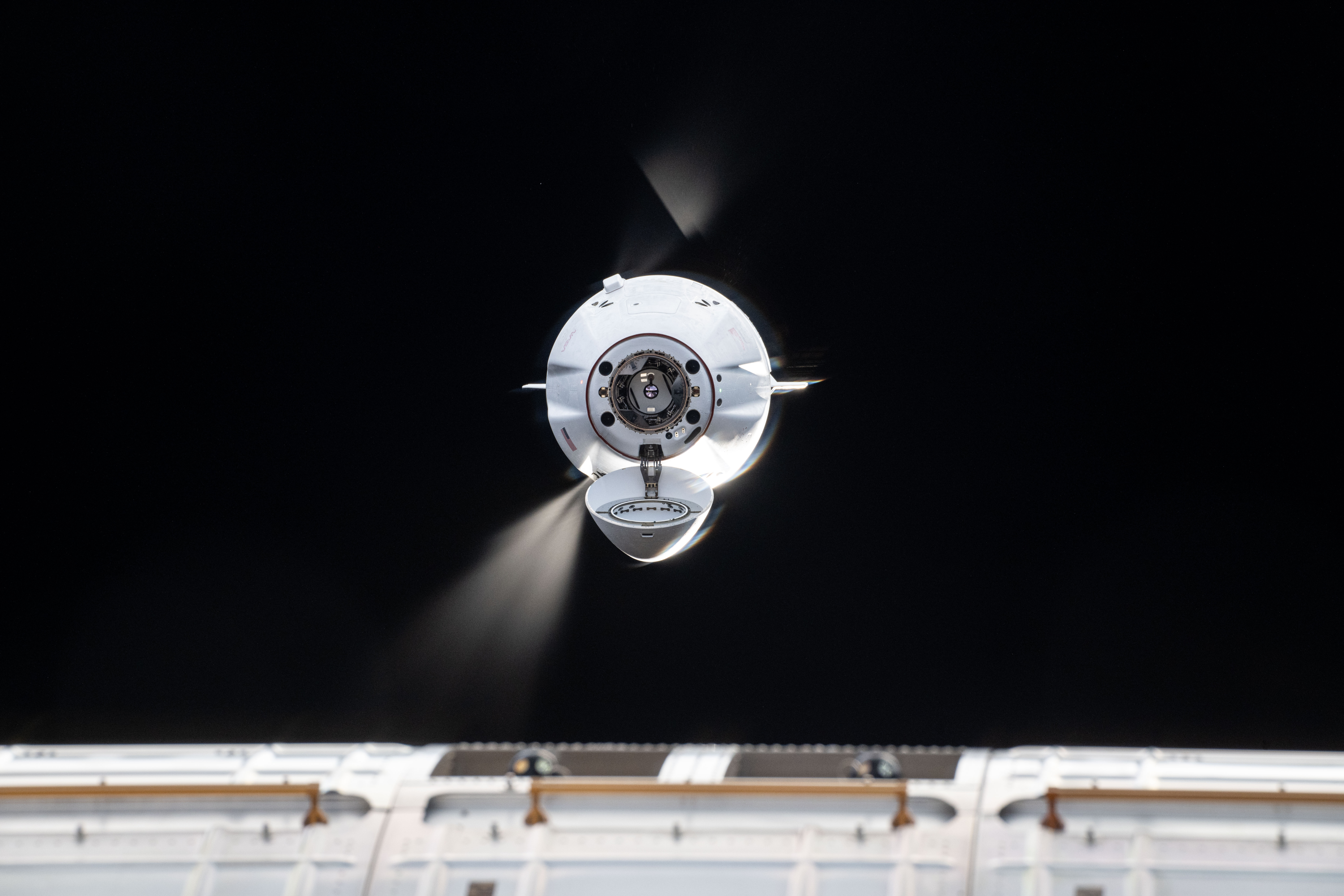
- Cargo Dragon C211 fires its Draco engines as it approaches ISS
- Names: CRS SpX-33
- Mission type: ISS resupply
- Operator: SpaceX
- COSPAR ID: 2025-186A
- SATCAT no.: 65304
- Mission duration: 187 days and 58 minutes

Spacecraft properties
- Spacecraft: Cargo Dragon C211
- Spacecraft type: Cargo Dragon
- Manufacturer: SpaceX

Start of mission
- Launch date: August 24, 2025, 06:45:36 UTC (2:45:36 am EDT)
- Rocket: Falcon 9 Block 5 (B1090.7), Flight 520
- Launch site: Cape Canaveral, SLC‑40

End of mission
- Recovered by: MV Shannon
- Landing date: February 27, 2026, 07:44 UTC (February 26, 11:44 PST)
- Landing site: Pacific Ocean near San Diego

Orbital parameters
- Reference system: Geocentric orbit
- Regime: Low Earth orbit
- Perigee altitude: 374 km (232 mi)
- Apogee altitude: 377 km (234 mi)
- Inclination: 51.6°

Docking with ISS
- Docking port: Harmony forward
- Docking date: August 25, 2025, 11:05 UTC
- Undocking date: February 26, 2026, 17:05 UTC
- Time docked: 185 days and 6 hours

Cargo
- Mass: 2,300 kg (5,100 lb)
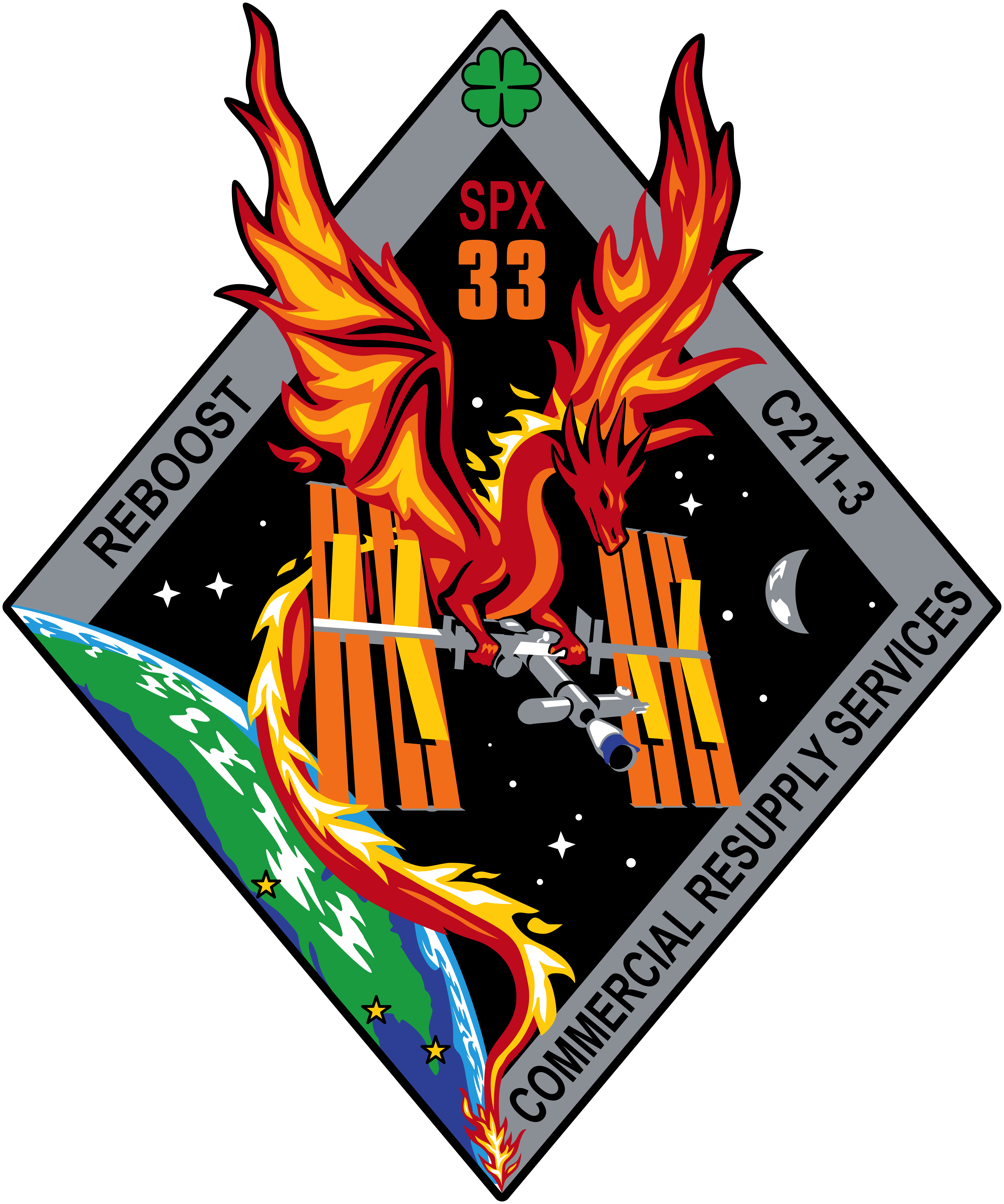
- Mission insignia Commercial Resupply Services Cargo Dragon flights

SpaceX CRS-33, also known as SpX-33, was a International Space Station (ISS) cargo resupply mission contracted by NASA and operated by SpaceX. The flight, launched on August 24, 2025 from Space Launch Complex 40 at Cape Canaveral Space Force Station, was SpaceX's 33rd cargo delivery mission under the Commercial Resupply Services program and the company's 50th overall Dragon flight to the ISS, including both cargo and crew missions.

== Boost kit demonstration ==
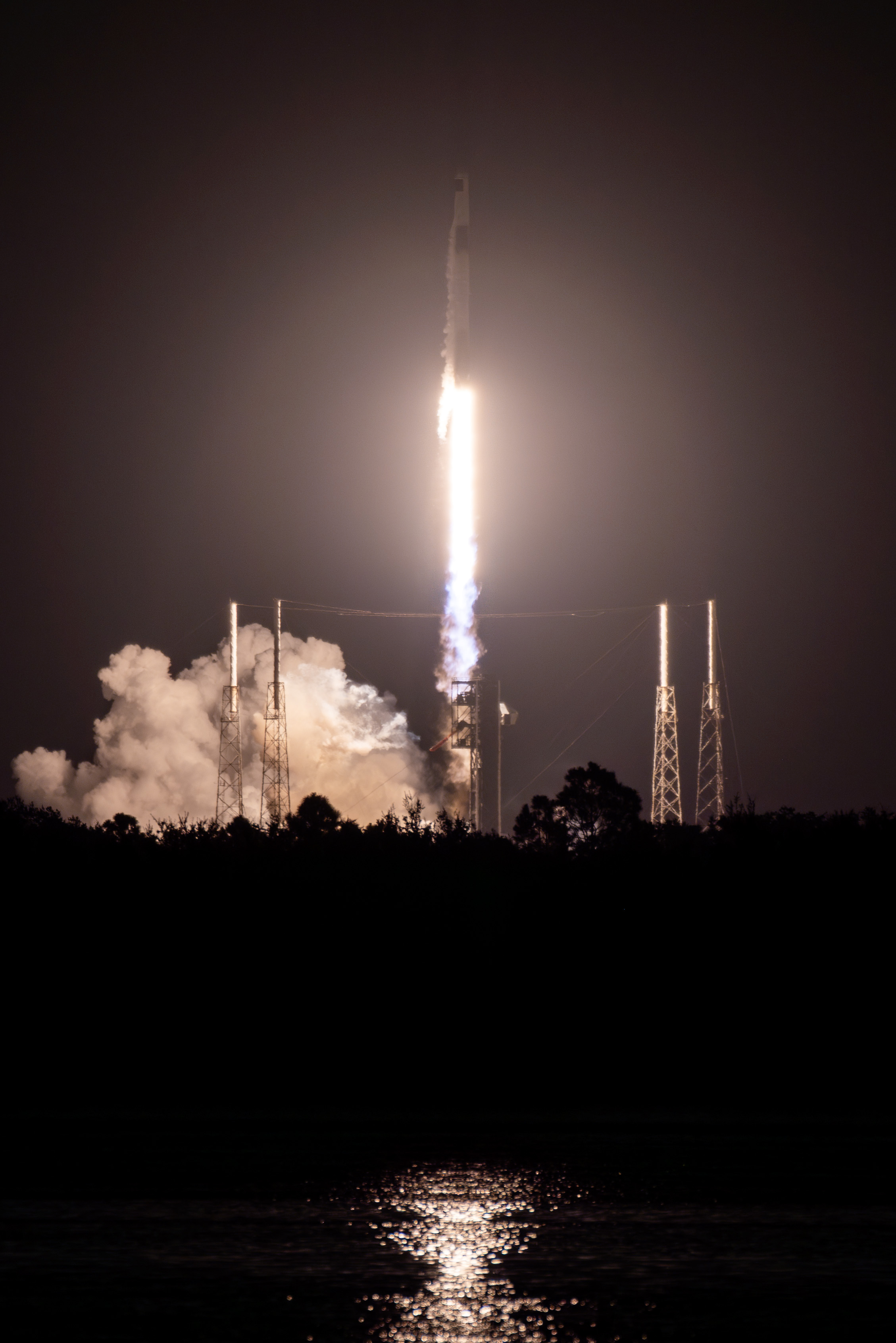
Launch of SpaceX CRS-33

A distinguishing feature of this mission was the inclusion of a "boost kit" propulsion module in Dragon's hollow unpressurized trunk, which is typically used to carry larger experiments that are robotically attached to the outside of the ISS. The kit comprises six dedicated propellant tanks containing hydrazine and nitrogen tetroxide, a helium pressurant tank, and two Draco thrusters aligned with the station's velocity vector. The boost kit is based on, but operates independently from Dragon's primary propulsion system. When activated, the system can add about 9 meters per second (20 mph) to the ISS's orbital velocity, equivalent to the total reboost impulse of roughly one-and-a-half Russian Progress cargo vehicles, which are normally responsible for orbit maintenance. The kit carries enough propellant to provide about one-third to one-fourth of the ISS's annual reboost needs. Demonstration reboosts began in September 2025. As of 29 December 2025, the spacecraft has performed five reboosts, and a final reboost is planned.

== Manifest ==
The spacecraft was loaded with a total of 2,300 kg (5,100 lb) of cargo, including equipment for scientific experiments, crew provisions, and fresh food such as 1,500 tortillas. Research equipment aboard the flight supports investigations into 3D printing in microgravity and the effects of long-duration spaceflight on the human body.

The cargo manifest is broken down as follows:

- Crew supplies: 1,091 kg (2,405 lb)
- Science investigations: 447 kg (985 lb)
- Spacewalk equipment: 55 kg (121 lb)
- Vehicle hardware: 587 kg (1,294 lb)
- Computer resources: 35 kg (77 lb)

== Return and disposal ==
The spacecraft remained docked until February 26, 2026, when it undocked and returned research samples and cargo to Earth with a parachute-assisted splashdown in the Pacific Ocean off California. The pressurized capsule was recovered for refurbishment and reuse, while the trunk containing the boost kit was discarded to burn up in the atmosphere.

== See also ==
- Uncrewed spaceflights to the International Space Station
