= Ovzon =

Satellite telecommunications company

Ovzon AB
- Company type: Public
- Industry: Telecommunications, Satellite internet access
- Predecessor: OverHorizon (Sweden)
- Founded: 2006
- Headquarters: Stockholm, Sweden
- Number of locations: Stockholm, Sweden; Florida, United States
- Area served: Worldwide
- Products: Mobile broadband services via satellite
- Website: www.ovzon.com

Ovzon AB is a broadband telecommunications company that offers, according to their informations, mobile satellite communications services, SATCOM-as-a-Service, to customers across the globe. The services combine high data speed with high mobility.

== History ==
Ovzon was founded in 2006 and has offices in Stockholm, Sweden, Herndon, VA and Tampa, FL in the USA. Ovzon is listed on Nasdaq Stockholm Mid Cap.

In September 2025, Ovzon signed a refinancing agreement with Danske Bank as part of a term loan of SEK 300 million, with a revolving credit facility of another SEK 300m, over a tenor of two years with a one-year extension, which reduced the company's interest expenses.

=== Ovzon-3 satellite ===
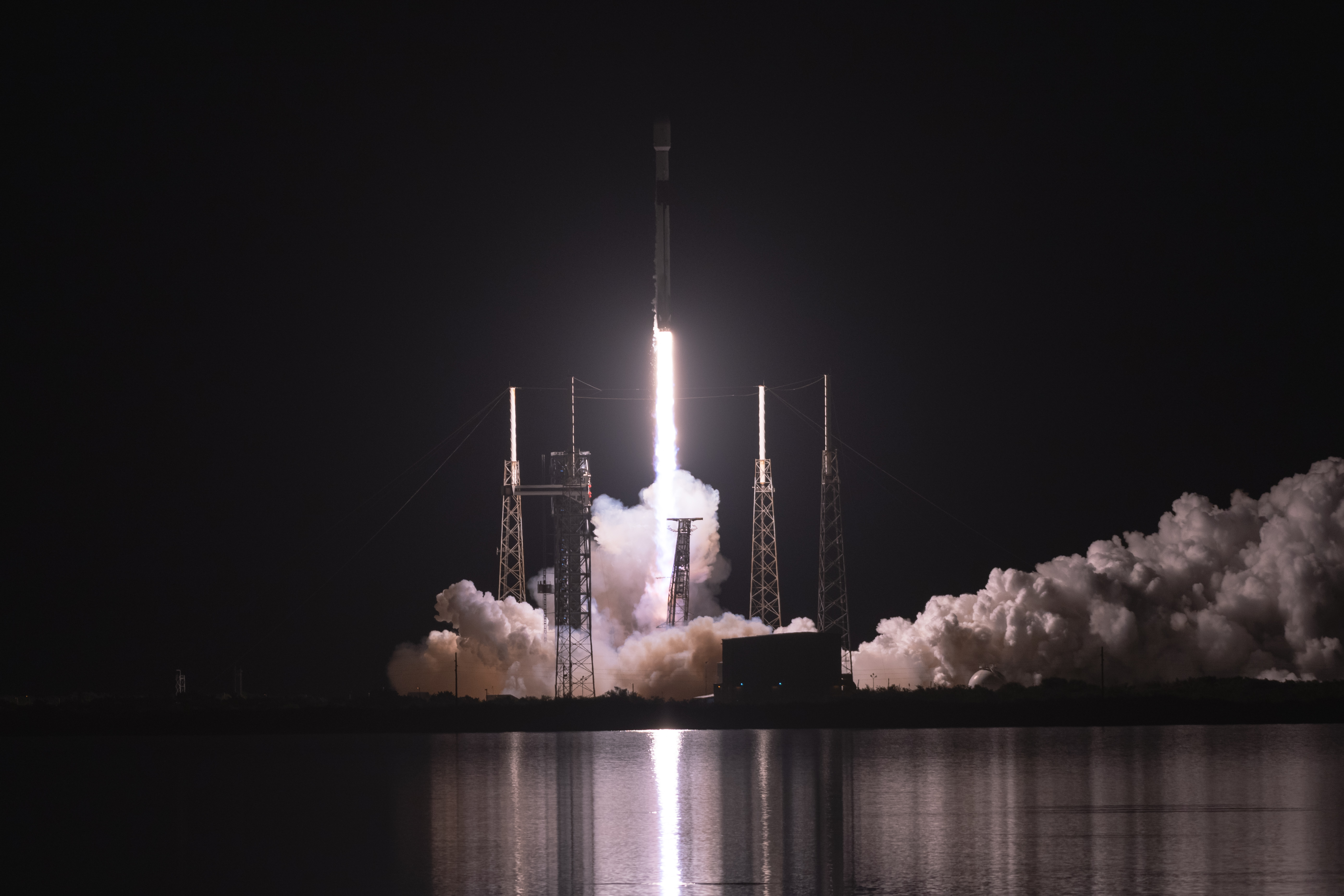
Ovzon-3 Launch

Ovzon planned to procure and launch its own communications satellite Ovzon-3 with a mass of 1800 kg, which was announced on 16 October 2018. The original launch contract was attributed to SpaceX for a Falcon Heavy mission no earlier than the fourth quarter of 2020. The satellite would have been delivered directly into geostationary orbit.

Ovzon announced 23 August 2019 that it had ended its agreement with SpaceX and would instead launch Ovzon-3 on an Arianespace Ariane 5 ECA launch vehicle in 2021.

Delays in satellite manufacturing led Ovzon to shift the launch back to SpaceX as the Ariane 5 approached its retirement. Ovzon-3 was launched on a Falcon 9 Block 5 on 3 January 2024. It is the first commercial satellite with Roll Out Solar Array that were deployed on 10 January 2024.
