= SpaceX CRS-35 =

Late 2026 cargo resupply mission to the International Space Station

- Falcon 9 rocket carrying Cargo Dragon C211 spacecraft lifts off from SLC-40
- Names: CRS SpX-35
- Mission type: ISS resupply
- Operator: SpaceX
- COSPAR ID: 2026-233A
- SATCAT no.: 101031
- Mission duration: 39 days, 11 hours, 29 minutes

Spacecraft properties
- Spacecraft: Cargo Dragon C211
- Spacecraft type: Cargo Dragon
- Manufacturer: SpaceX

Start of mission
- Launch date: October 13, 2026, 10:33:44 UTC (6:33:44 am EDT)
- Rocket: Falcon 9 Block 5 (B1096‑8), Flight 695
- Launch site: Cape Canaveral, SLC‑40

End of mission
- Recovered by: MV Shannon
- Landing date: November 21, 2026, 22:03 UTC (02:03 pm PST)
- Landing site: Pacific Ocean near Los Angeles

Orbital parameters
- Reference system: Geocentric orbit
- Regime: Low Earth orbit

Docking with ISS
- Docking port: Harmony zenith
- Docking date: October 15, 2026, 14:27 UTC
- Undocking date: November 20, 2026, 17:05 UTC
- Time docked: 36 days, 2 hours, 38 minutes

Cargo
- Mass: 6,322 lb (2,868 kg)
- Pressurised: 3,687 lb (1,672 kg)
- Unpressurised: 2,635 lb (1,195 kg)
- Mission insignia Commercial Resupply Services Cargo Dragon flights

SpaceX CRS-35, also known as SpX-35, was an International Space Station (ISS) cargo resupply mission contracted by NASA and operated by SpaceX. The flight launched on October 13, 2026 from Space Launch Complex 40 at Cape Canaveral Space Force Station. It was SpaceX's 35th cargo delivery mission under the Commercial Resupply Services program.

== Manifest ==
The Cargo Dragon spacecraft was loaded with a total of 6,322 lb (2,868 kg) of cargo and supplies before its launch, including 3,687 lb (1,672 kg) of pressurized and 2,635 lb (1,195 kg) of unpressurized cargo. External (unpressurized) cargo included the final two IROSA solar arrays for ISS.

Internal (pressurized) cargo included:

- Crew supplies: 844 lb (383 kg)
- Science investigations: 1,307 lb (593 kg)
- Spacewalk equipment: 417 lb (189 kg)
- Vehicle hardware: 799 lb (362 kg)
- Computer resources 81 lb (36 kg)

== Research ==
A variety of experiments was transported to the ISS, providing insight for researchers and the broader scientific community.

CRS-35 carried replacement ISS Roll Out Solar Arrays. The mission also carried a payload designed by Langston University.

=== LambdaVision-1 ===
LambdaVision-1 investigates the production of artificial retinal tissue in microgravity. Researchers are studying whether depositing the tissue in successive thin layers in microgravity can produce more uniform and stable material. The research could contribute to the development of artificial retinas for patients with retinal diseases.

=== Stellar Spheroids ===
Stellar Spheroids studies the growth and function of three-dimensional human heart-tissue models in microgravity. Researchers are examining whether the space environment promotes the formation of vascular networks within the tissue. The findings could help improve models used to study cardiovascular disease and evaluate the effects of drugs on heart function.

=== ELF-Unconventional Glass 2 ===
ELF-Unconventional Glass 2 investigates how glass made from non-traditional elements forms in microgravity. Researchers will observe the behavior of molten glass in space and analyze the resulting samples after their return to Earth. The work could inform the development of glasses with improved mechanical, optical, or durability properties for use in spacecraft and other technologies.

=== MINDS ===
The MINDS investigation studies brain organoids to investigate neuroinflammation associated with neurodegenerative diseases. Its experimental approach includes combining cells from multiple individuals into organoid models, allowing researchers to examine biological responses across a more diverse set of cells. The research could help identify potential therapeutic targets for diseases such as Alzheimer's disease, Parkinson's disease, and multiple sclerosis.

=== AVATAR-Org1 ===
AVATAR-Org1 investigates the effects of spaceflight on human brain tissue using small, laboratory-grown three-dimensional models called miBrains. The models are to remain aboard the ISS for five weeks and are compared with corresponding tissue maintained on Earth. The investigation aims to characterize cellular changes associated with spaceflight and assess whether human brain tissue can be reliably grown and studied in space.

=== MVP-Plant-02 ===
MVP-Plant-02 investigates whether crop diseases develop more rapidly or become more severe in microgravity. Researchers compare infected plants grown aboard the space station with corresponding plants grown on Earth, examining molecular and structural changes caused by the disease. The findings could inform the development of disease-resistant crops for agriculture on Earth and future space missions.

=== Commercially Enabled Rapid Space Science ===
The Commercially Enabled Rapid Space Science initiative includes an evaluation of a compact microplate reader for analyzing biological samples aboard the ISS. The experiment tests the device's ability to measure biomarkers, including antibodies, antigens, and proteins. Rapid onboard analysis could help researchers detect infections and other health issues in astronauts without having to wait for samples to be returned to Earth.

=== Tumor AVatars in Space (TAVIS) ===
Researchers at the Wake Forest Institute for Regenerative Medicine are using tumor tissue organoids grown from patient-derived colorectal cancer cells to investigate responses to chemotherapy under microgravity, and to identify potential targets for new cancer treatments. The research aims to improve chemotherapy response in patients and support the development of more personalized treatment strategies.

=== Wildfire-related mudflow research ===
A research project led by the University of California, San Diego, investigates the forces involved in mudflows and debris flows that can occur after wildfires. Experiments in microgravity help researchers examine particle behavior and flow dynamics while reducing the influence of gravity-driven effects that complicate measurements on Earth. The findings could contribute to improved models for predicting these natural hazards.

=== Genes in Space protein-production experiment ===
A student-led investigation from the Genes in Space program studies protein production in microgravity. The experiment tests multiple DNA sequences that encode the same protein to determine which sequences support more efficient protein production in space. The results could inform future biological manufacturing applications, including the production of therapeutics and other materials during long-duration space missions.

=== SCAMPI ===
CRS-35 also carried three live Halocaridina rubra shrimp as part of the SCAMPI Project, an initiative carried out between 51 students at The Spring Institute for Forests on the Moon, École Polytechnique, ISAE-SUPAERO, IPSA, École d'ingénieurs de PURPAN, Politecnico di Torino, University of Trento, University of Pavia, Utrecht University, TU Delft, Queen Mary University of London, and the University of Arizona.

=== Student Spaceflight Experiements Program ===
CRS-35 also carried the Atlantis and Discovery experiments payload for the Student Spaceflight Experiments Program (SSEP), corresponding to Missions 20 and 21 respectively. The investigations cover a range of subjects, including seed germination, crystal growth, cell biology, and materials science. Each community is based on a K-12 school or college/university. Payload includes:

Mission	Institution	Community	Experiment
20	Central Alabama Community College	Alexander City, AL	Investigating the Effects of Microgravity on the Early Root Development Rate of Radishes
20	Morgan Community College	Fort Morgan, CO	Effects of Zero Gravity on The Germination of Radishes in Hydrogel
20	Florida Institute of Technology	Melbourne, FL	Hydrogel Radiation-Shielding Viability Under the Influence of Microgravity
20	University of Tennessee	Knoxville, TN	The Effects of Space Travel on Speed Germination and Plant Stress
21	Edmonton Public Schools	Edmonton, AB, Canada	How Does Microgravity Affect the Oxidation of Copper in a Vinegar, Salt, and Water Solution?
21	R. Tait Mckenzie Public School	Mississippi Mills, ON, Canada	Would broccoli sprout faster in low gravity?
21	Paradise Valley Unified School District	Phoenix, AZ	The Effect of Microgravity on the Growth and Structure of Covalent Organic Frameworks (COFs)
21	Pasadena City College	Pasadena, CA	The Effect of Microgravity on the Crystallogenesis of Hen Egg White Lysozyme
21	University of Colorado, Colorado Springs	Colorado Springs, CO	Space Climate Seeds: Investigating Osmotic Stress-Primed Germination in Microgravity
21	Florida Institute of Technology	Melbourne, FL	Effects of Microgravity on Neurodegeneration using Tauopathy Model
21	St. Petersburg College	St. Petersburg, FL	The Effect of Microgravity on the Formation and Properties of Calcium Alginate Hydrogels
21	University of South Florida	Tampa, FL	Microgravity Effects on Chitosan Hydrogel Structure for Potential Wound-Care Applications
21	Tulane University	New Orleans, LA	Coacervate Protocells in Microgravity: Stability, Function, and Implications for the Origins of Life Beyond Earth
21	UMass Lowell	Lowell, MA	Aging and Coarsening of Milk-Protein Micelles
21	Metropolitan Community College	Omaha, NE	Radiation Detection via Dosimeter Near Solar Maximum
21	City School Distirct of Albany	Albany, NY	The effects of microgravity on red maple tree seed germination
21	ABTech Community College	Asheville, NC	How are lubricating oils affected by space travel?
21	Ohio University	Athens, OH	Examining the Effect of Microgravity on the Metabolism of the Antihistamine Promethazine HCl, using Caenorhabditis elegans as a Model
21	Community College of Allegheny County	Pittsburgh, PA	Evaluating the Effect of Microgravity on Insulin Activity and Glucose Regulation Post-Flight
21	North East Independent School District	San Antonio, TX	The Effects of Microgravity on the Growth of Stems and Roots in Length and Direction of Rye Plants
21	Grantsburg School District	iForward-Grantsburg, WI	The germination and growth of lentil sprouts in microgravity

== Launch ==
CRS-35 was originally scheduled to launch in November 2026. However, during the launch of Soyuz MS-28 for the ISS on 27 November 2025, the launch pad at the Baikonur Cosmodrome's Site 31 suffered extensive damage and was rendered inoperable, resulting in an acceleration of future resupply missions. In December 2025, CRS-35's launch was to be accelerated to August 2026. Following the rapid repair of Site 31, CRS-35 was moved back to fall 2026.
