= I12 =

I12 or I-12 may refer to:

- I12 engine
- Interstate 12, a highway in the U.S. state of Louisiana
- Japanese submarine I-12
- Jönköping Regiment (1816–1927), a Swedish infantry regiment
- Småland Regiment (1928–1974), a Swedish infantry regiment

== See also ==
- 112 (disambiguation)
