= Cargo Dragon C211 =

Uncrewed cargo capsule built by SpaceX

Dragon C211
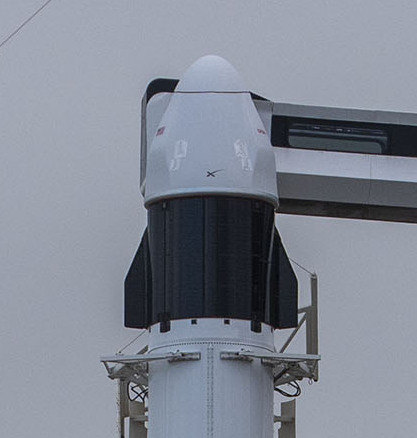
- C211 during preflight operations for CRS-26
- Type: Space capsule
- Class: Dragon 2
- Owner: SpaceX
- Manufacturer: SpaceX

Specifications
- Dimensions: 4.4 m × 3.7 m (14 ft × 12 ft)
- Power: Solar panel
- Rocket: Falcon 9 Block 5

History
- Location: California
- First flight: 26 November 2022 - 11 January 2023; SpaceX CRS-26
- Last flight: 13 October 2026 - 21 November 2026; SpaceX CRS-35
- Flights: 4
- Flight time: 314 days, 19 hours, 30 minutes

Dragon 2s

Dragon C211 is the third Cargo Dragon 2 spacecraft, and the third in a line of International Space Station resupply craft, which replaced the Dragon capsule, manufactured by SpaceX. NASA contracts the mission under the Commercial Resupply Services (CRS) program. It flew for the first time on the CRS-26 mission in November 2022.

== Cargo Dragon ==
C211 is the third and final SpaceX Dragon 2 cargo variant. C211 and the other Cargo Dragons differ from the crewed variant by launching without seats, cockpit controls, astronaut life support systems, or SuperDraco abort engines. The Cargo Dragon improved many aspects of the original Dragon design, including the recovery and refurbishment process.

Cargo Dragon capsules splash under parachutes in the Atlantic Ocean east of Florida or the Gulf of Mexico, rather than the previous recovery zone in the Pacific Ocean west of Baja California. This NASA preference was added to all CRS-2 awards to allow cargo to be more quickly returned to the Kennedy Space Center after splashdown.

== Flights ==
Mission	Patch	Launch date (UTC)	Duration	Landing date (UTC)	Notes	Outcome
CRS-26		26 November 2022; 19:20:42	45 days	11 January 2023; 10:19	Sixth time a Dragon 2 used for a CRS mission, sixth launch of phase 2 of CRS missions.	Success
CRS-29		10 November 2023; 01:28:14	42 days	22 December 2023; 17:33	Ninth time a Dragon 2 used for a CRS mission, ninth launch of phase 2 of CRS missions.	Success
CRS-33		24 August 2025; 06:45:36	187 days	27 February 2026; 07:44	Equipped with a "boost kit" with extra propellant and engines to perform re-boosts of the ISS.	Success
CRS-35		13 October 2026; 10:33:44	39 days	21 November 2026; 22:03	Fifteenth time a Dragon 2 used for a CRS mission, fifteenth launch of phase 2 of CRS missions.	Success

== See also ==
- SpaceX Crew-5
- Boeing CST-100 Starliner
- Cargo Dragon C208
- Cargo Dragon C209
