= SpaceX CRS-26 =

2022 American resupply spaceflight to the ISS

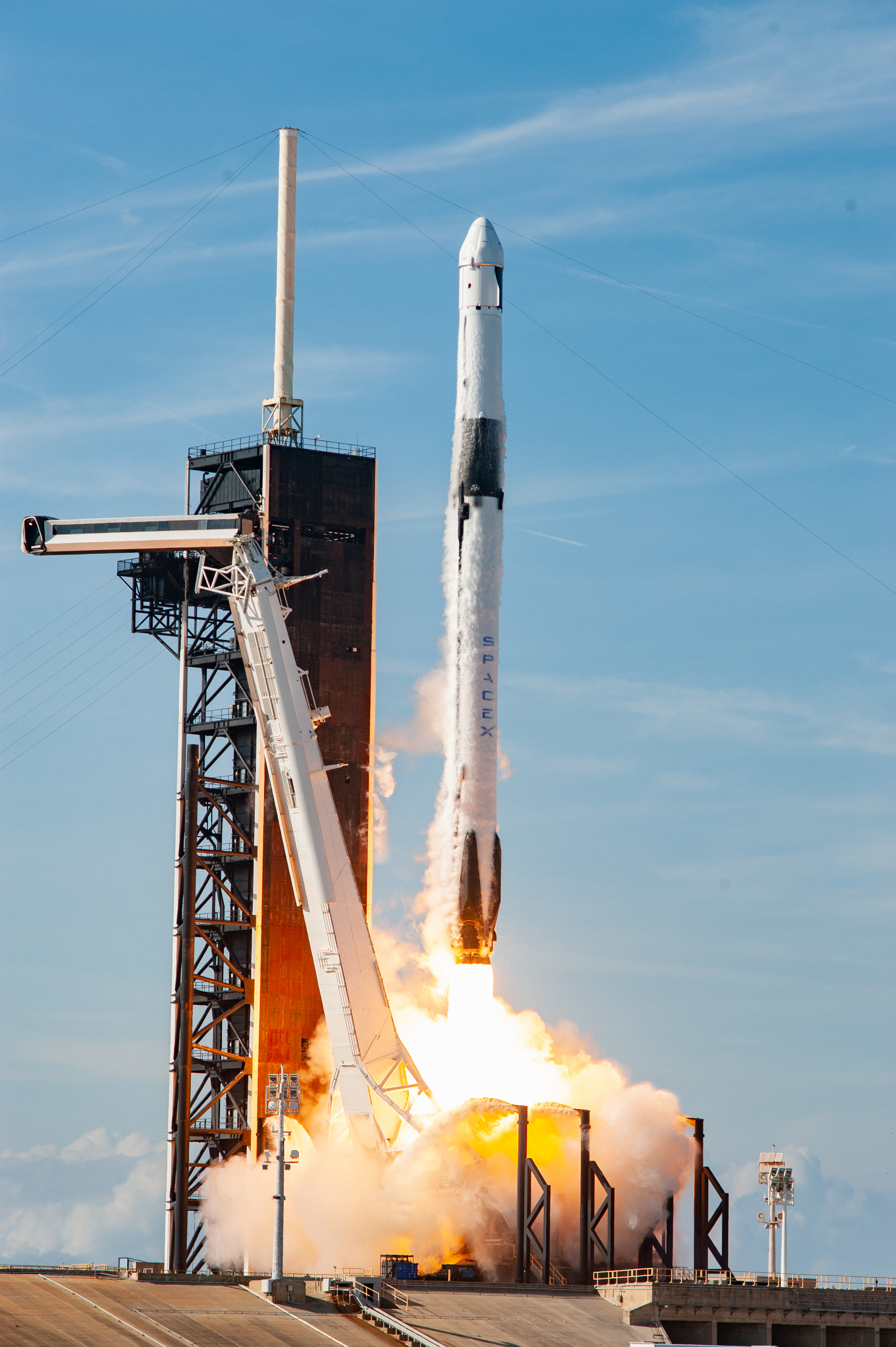
- Launch of CRS-26
- Names: SpX-26
- Mission type: ISS resupply
- Operator: SpaceX
- COSPAR ID: 2022-159A
- SATCAT no.: 54371
- Mission duration: 45 days, 14 hours, 59 minutes

Spacecraft properties
- Spacecraft: Cargo Dragon C211
- Spacecraft type: Cargo Dragon
- Manufacturer: SpaceX
- Dry mass: 9,525 kg (20,999 lb)
- Dimensions: Height: 8.1 m (27 ft); Diameter: 4 m (13 ft)

Start of mission
- Launch date: 26 November 2022, 19:20:42 UTC
- Rocket: Falcon 9 Block 5 B1076-1
- Launch site: Kennedy Space Center, LC-39A

End of mission
- Recovered by: MV Megan
- Landing date: 11 January 2023, 10:19 UTC
- Landing site: Gulf of Mexico

Orbital parameters
- Reference system: Geocentric orbit
- Regime: Low Earth orbit
- Inclination: 51.66°

Docking with ISS
- Docking port: Harmony zenith
- Docking date: 27 November 2022, 12:39 UTC
- Undocking date: 9 January 2023, 22:05 UTC
- Time docked: 43 days, 9 hours, 26 minutes
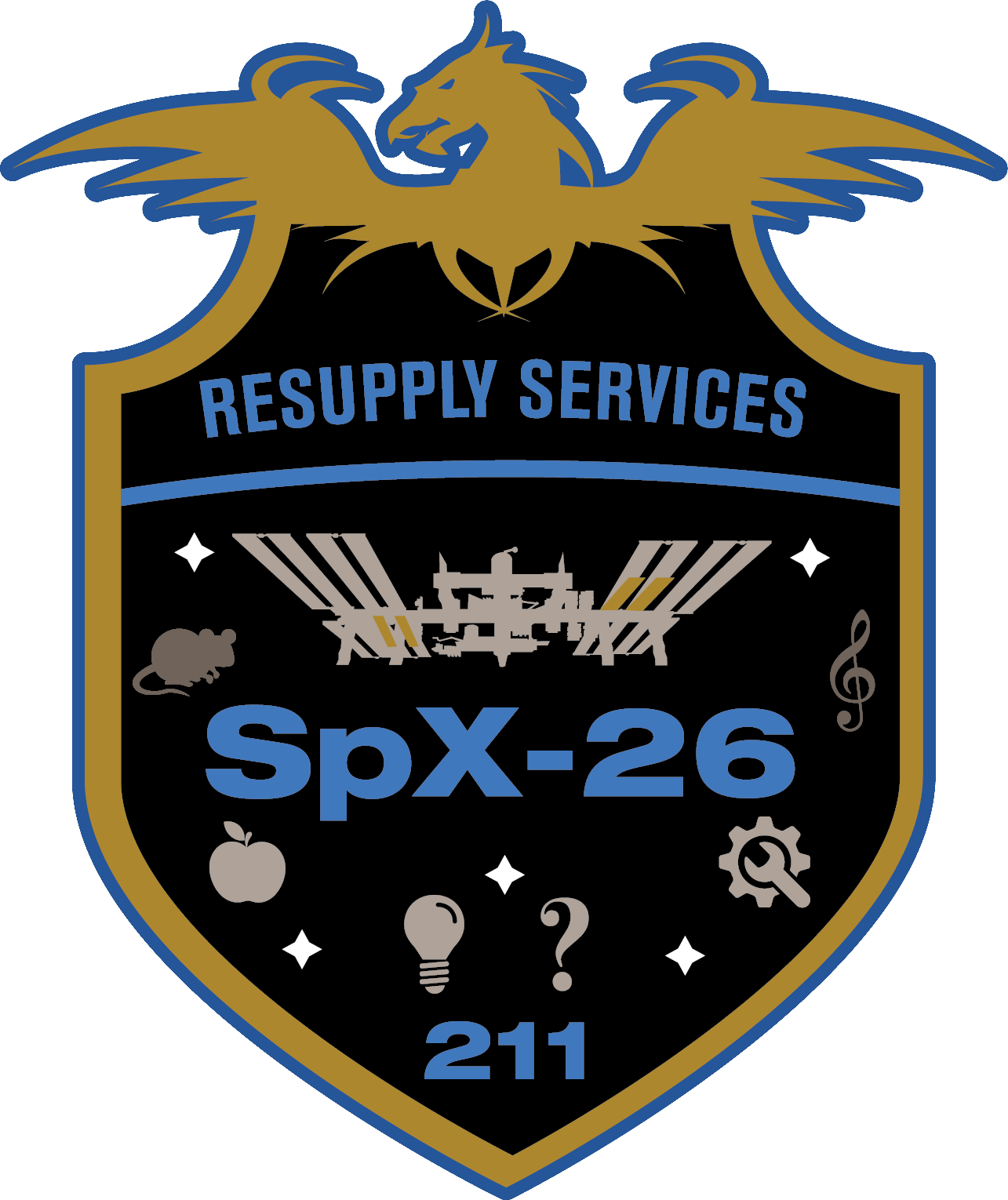
- SpaceX CRS-26 mission patch Commercial Resupply Services Cargo Dragon flights

SpaceX CRS-26, also known as SpX-26, was a Commercial Resupply Service mission to the International Space Station (ISS) launched on 26 November 2022. The mission was contracted by NASA and flown by SpaceX using a Cargo Dragon. This was the sixth flight for SpaceX under NASA's CRS Phase 2 contract awarded in January 2016.

== Cargo Dragon ==
SpaceX plans to reuse each Cargo Dragon up to five times. Cargo Dragon does not include SuperDraco abort engines, seats, cockpit controls or life support system needed on a Crew Dragon. Dragon 2 improves on Dragon 1 in several ways, including lessened refurbishment time, leading to shorter periods between flights.

Cargo Dragon capsules under the NASA CRS Phase 2 contract land near Florida in the ocean.

== Payload ==
NASA contracted for the CRS-26 mission from SpaceX and therefore determines the primary payload, date of launch, and orbital parameters for the Cargo Dragon.

=== ISS Roll Out Solar Arrays (iROSA) ===
Second pair of new solar arrays using XTJ Prime space solar cells. They were delivered to the station in the unpressurized trunk of the Cargo Dragon spacecraft.

The installation of these new solar arrays, designated 4A and 3A, required two spacewalks: one to prepare the worksite with a modification kit and another to install the new panel.

== Research ==
NASA Glenn Research Center studies:

European Space Agency (ESA) research and activities:

- ESA's Suture in Space experiment investigating how tissues heal in weightlessness. Living tissue from biopsies will be cut and sewn back together, before being sent to space where astronauts will activate the cells to monitor the healing mechanisms.
- ESA's Osteogenic Cells experiment which aims to investigate the mechanisms of impaired bone formation during space flight and whether microgravity conditions alter osteoblast function in vitro.
- As part of the research payload, the Artery in Microgravity experiment from the ESA Orbit Your Thesis programme will be installed inside the ICE Cubes Facility.

== CubeSats ==
CubeSats carried by this mission, deployed through NRCSD#24 (including ELaNa 49) and J-SSOD#24:

- TJREVERB, a 2U CubeSat built by students from Thomas Jefferson High School for Science and Technology. TJREVERB is testing Iridium with Passive Magnet Stabilization in Low Earth Orbit.
- ORCASat, a 2U CubeSat for the precision photometric calibration of major astronomical observatories worldwide (notably the Rubin Observatory in Chile and Pan-STARRS in Hawaii).
- MARIO (Measurement of Actuator Response and Impedance on Orbit) is a 3U CubeSat collaboration between the University of Michigan's Michigan eXploration Laboratory (MXL), Extreme Diagnostics, and Michigan's Active Intelligent and Multifunctional Structure (AIMS) Lab, and NASA. The mission objective is to characterize the performance of piezoelectric actuators and health monitoring systems in low Earth orbit conditions. Test data will help develop future advanced space mechanisms.
- NUTSat is a 2U CubeSat for systems engineering training and commercial aircraft safety technology demonstration mission, from NFU, Let'scom, Gran Systems and NSPO.
- LORIS (Low Orbit Reconnaissance Imagery Satellite) from Dalhousie University, will be the first CubeSat from Atlantic Canada to be launched by the Canadian Space Agency. The mission objective is to obtain photographs via the camera payload, which will be used to study and monitor shorelines and ocean life activity.
- petitSat, from Goddard Space Flight Center.
- SPORT (Scintillation Prediction Observations Research Task), a collaboration between the Brazilian Space Agency (AEB), the Aeronautics Institute of Technology (ITA) in Brazil, the National Institute for Space Research (INPE), and NASA's Marshall Space Flight Center. SPORT is a 6U CubeSat that will advance our understanding of the nature and evolution of ionospheric structures around sunset to improve predictions of disturbances that affect radio propagation and telecommunication signals.
- DanteSat, from NPC SpaceMind.
- Surya Satellite-1 (SS-1), 1U CubeSat by Surya University
- OPTIMAL-1, 3U CubeSat by ArkEdge Space
- HSKSAT, 3U CubeSat by Harada Seiki

== Gallery ==
SpaceX CRS-26
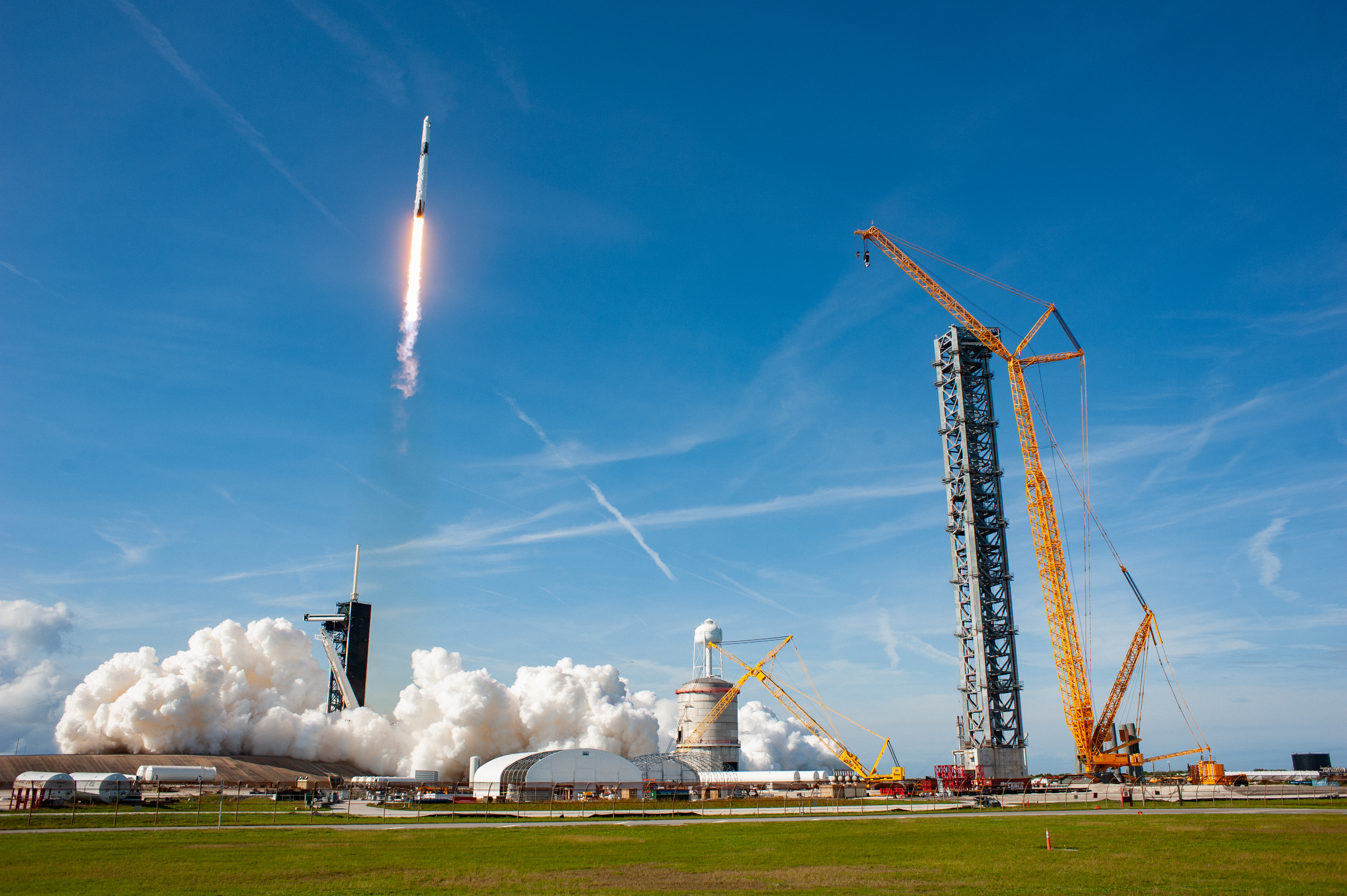
Launch of CRS-26

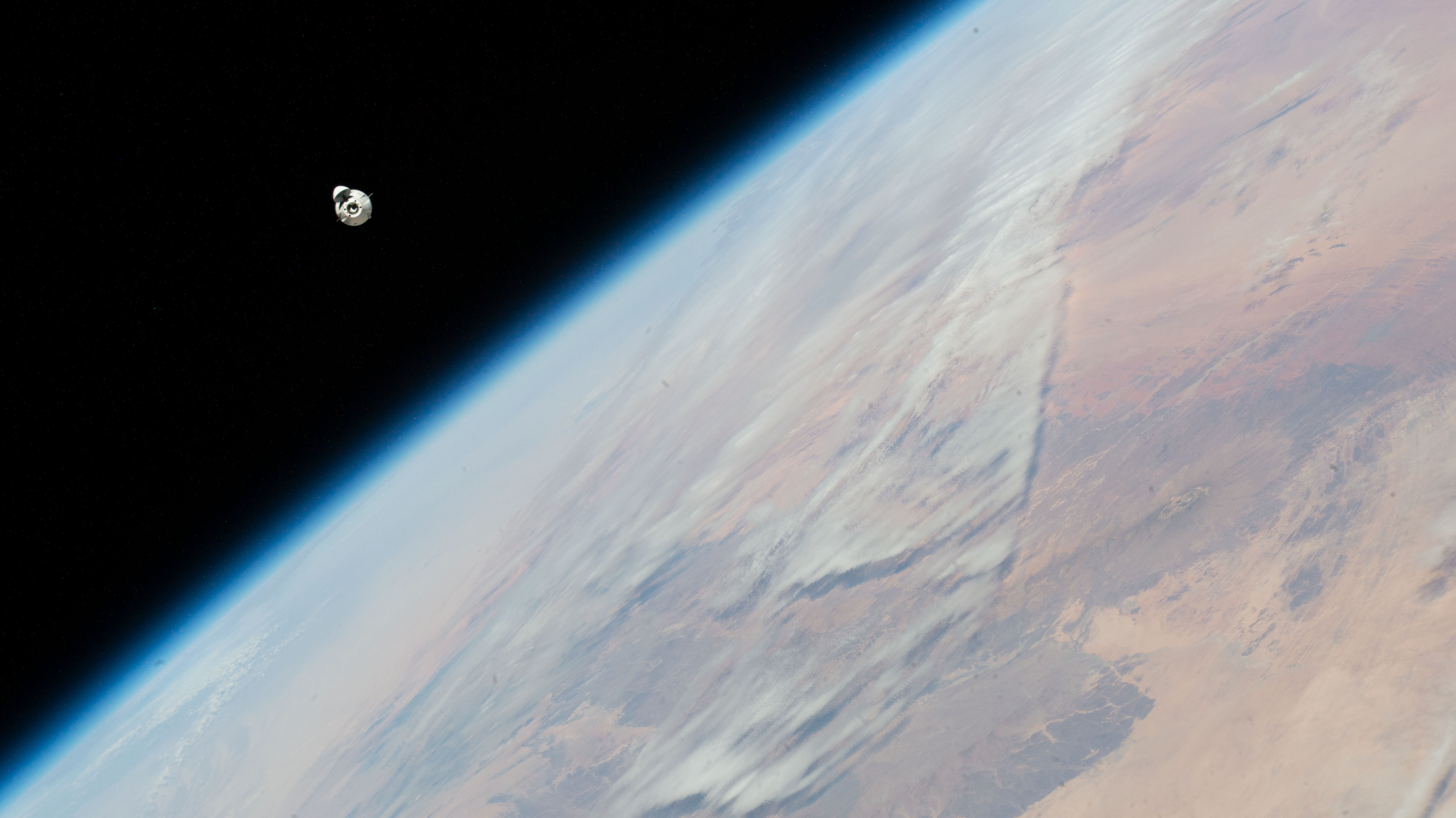
Dragon approaching the ISS

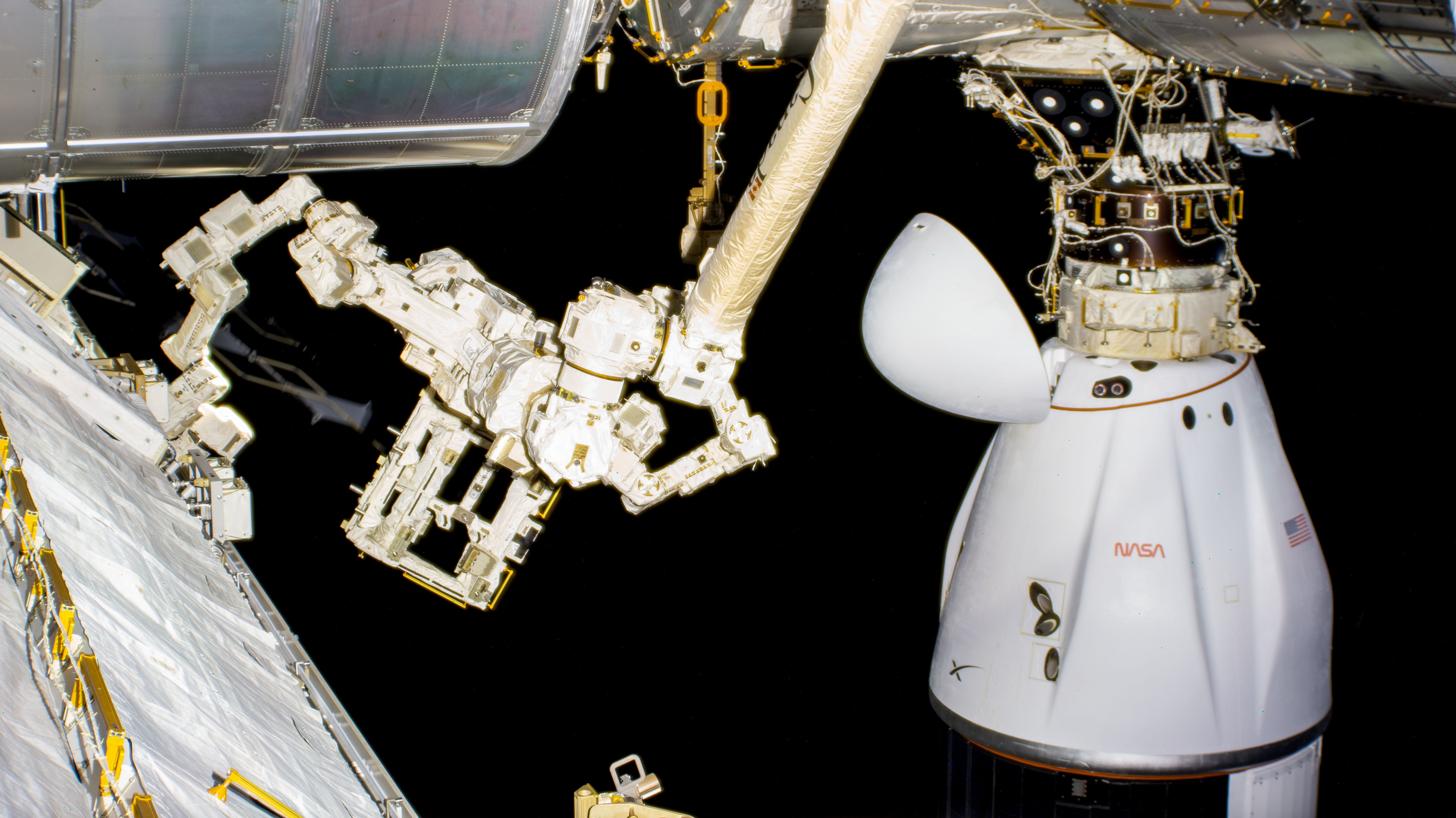
Dragon docked to the ISS

== See also ==
- Uncrewed spaceflights to the International Space Station
