= 211 (disambiguation) =

211 AD is a year of the Common Era.

211 may also refer to:

- 211 (North American Numbering Plan)
- 211 BC, a year Before the Common Era

== Places ==
- 211 Isolda, a Main-Belt asteroid, the 211th asteroid registered
- Route 211, see List of highways numbered 211

== Telecommunications ==
- 2-1-1, an N-1-1 telephone number in North America
- +211, the telephone country code for South Sudan

== Transportation ==
- 211 series, a Japanese electric multiple unit train class
- US-Bangla Airlines Flight 211, a 2018 plane crash

== Other uses ==
- 211 (film), a 2018 U.S. crime-drama film
- Project 211, a Chinese project to develop comprehensive universities and colleges
- Raufoss Mk 211, a .50-calibre ammunition round

== See also ==
- 211th (disambiguation)
- 21 (disambiguation)
- 2/11 (disambiguation)
- 211th (disambiguation)
