= 121 =

121 may refer to:

- 121 (number), the natural number following 120 and preceding 122
- AD 121, a year in the 2nd century AD
- 121 BC, a year in the 2nd century BC
- 121 (Eagle) Sqn, a Royal Air Force aircraft squadron that during the Second World War was one of the three Eagle Squadrons manned by American volunteers
- Route 121 (MBTA), a bus route in Boston
- 121 (New Jersey bus), a New Jersey Transit bus route
- Road 121, see list of highways numbered 121
- Russian cruiser Moskva (pennant number: 121)
- "121", a song by Robert Forster from the album Calling from a Country Phone
- 121 Hermione, a main-belt asteroid
- Mazda 121, various models of automobiles produced by Mazda
- Unit 121 - Hezbollah assassination squad

== See also ==
- 121st (disambiguation)
- 12/1 (disambiguation)
- Unbiunium, a hypothetical chemical element with atomic number 121
