= 211th Aviation Regiment =

- Country: USA
- Allegiance: Utah Army National Guard (UT ARNG)
- Branch: United States Army Aviation Branch
- Type: Aviation

Insignia
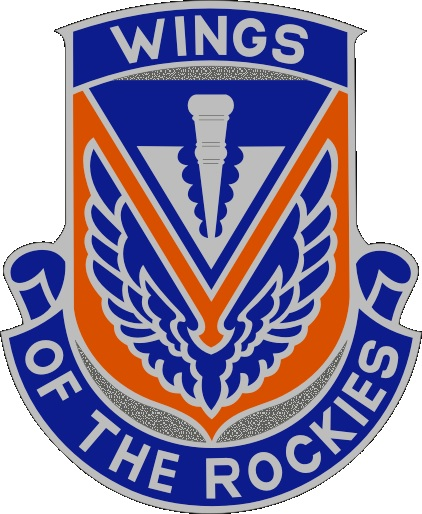
- Distinctive Unit Insignia

Aircraft flown
- Attack helicopter: AH-64D Apache
- Cargo helicopter: CH-47F Chinook
- Utility helicopter: UH-60L Black Hawk

The 211th Aviation Regiment is an aviation regiment of the U.S. Army. It is based in West Jordan, Utah at South Valley Regional Airport, and consist of two battalions.

== Structure ==
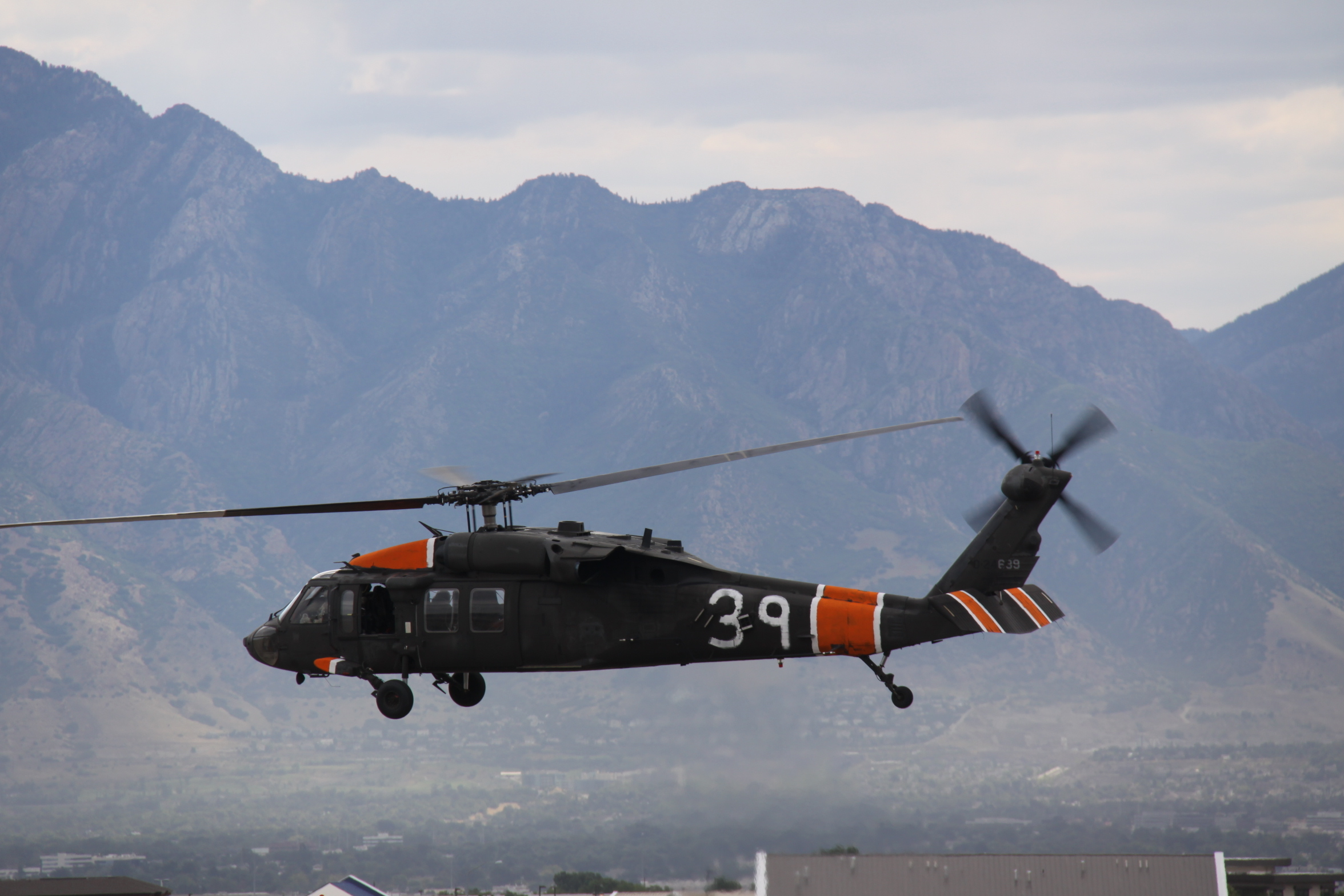
UH-60 Black Hawk helicopter assigned to the 2nd Battalion, 211th Aviation Regiment, Utah Army National Guard

- 1st Battalion (Attack Reconnaissance) (AH-64). Nicknamed the "Air Pirates".
  - Afghanistan 2020 (TF Ivy Eagle)
  - Headquarters and Headquarters Company at Army Aviation Support Facility, South Valley Regional Airport, (UT ARNG)
  - Company A at Army Aviation Support Facility, South Valley Regional Airport, (UT ARNG)
  - Company B "Buccaneers" at Army Aviation Support Facility, South Valley Regional Airport, (UT ARNG) (Afghanistan from June 2004 / HQ at Kandahar part of Joint Task Force Wings)
  - Company C at Army Aviation Support Facility, South Valley Regional Airport, (UT ARNG)
  - Company D at Army Aviation Support Facility, South Valley Regional Airport, (UT ARNG)
  - Company E at Army Aviation Support Facility, South Valley Regional Airport, (UT ARNG)
- 2nd Battalion (General Support)
  - Company A at Army Aviation Support Facility, South Valley Regional Airport, (UT ARNG)
  - Company B (CH-47)
    - Detachment 1 at Davenport (IA ARNG)
    - Detachment 2 (MN ARNG)
  - Company C (UH-60) "Northstar Dustoff"
    - Detachment 1 at Waterloo (IA ARNG)
    - Detachment 2 (MN ARNG)
  - Company D (Aviation Support) at Army Aviation Support Facility, South Valley Regional Airport, (UT ARNG)
    - Detachment 1 at Davenport (IA ARNG)
    - Detachment 3 at Waterloo (IA ARNG)
  - Company E (Field Services) at Army Aviation Support Facility, South Valley Regional Airport, (UT ARNG)
    - Detachment 1 at Davenport (IA ARNG)
    - Detachment 3 at Waterloo (IA ARNG)
  - Company F (AR ARNG)
  - Company G (UH-60) (WY ARNG)
    - Detachment 1 at Army Aviation Support Facility, South Valley Regional Airport, (UT ARNG)
