= 112 =

112 may refer to:

- 112 (number), the natural number following 111 and preceding 113
- 112 (emergency telephone number), the standard emergency phone number in the European Union and on GSM cellphones
- 112 (band), an R&B quartet from Atlanta, Georgia, United States
  - 112 (album), album from the band of the same name
- 112 BC, a year
- AD 112, a year of the Julian calendar
- Route 112 (MBTA), a bus route in Massachusetts, United States
- 112 (New Jersey bus)
- KFM 112M aircraft engine
- Thai Criminal Code section 112, forbidding lèse-majesté in Thailand
- 112 Iphigenia, a main-belt asteroid

== See also ==
- 1/12 (disambiguation)
- 11/2 (disambiguation)
- I12 (disambiguation)
- Copernicium, synthetic chemical element with atomic number 112
