= 211th =

211th may refer to:

- 211th Battalion (American Legion), CEF, a unit in the Canadian Expeditionary Force during the First World War
- 211th Military Police Battalion, a unit of the Massachusetts Army National Guard
- 211th Rescue Squadron, a unit of the Alaska Air National Guard that flies the HC-130 Hercules
- 211th (Wessex) Field Hospital, a hospital unit of the British Army 1967–1996

== See also ==
- 211th Street/Lincoln Highway station, a commuter rail station on the Metra Electric line in Park Forest, Illinois
- 211 (number)
- 211, the year 211 (CCXI) of the Julian calendar
