= Crew Dragon Launch Abort System =

Spacecraft launch-escape system

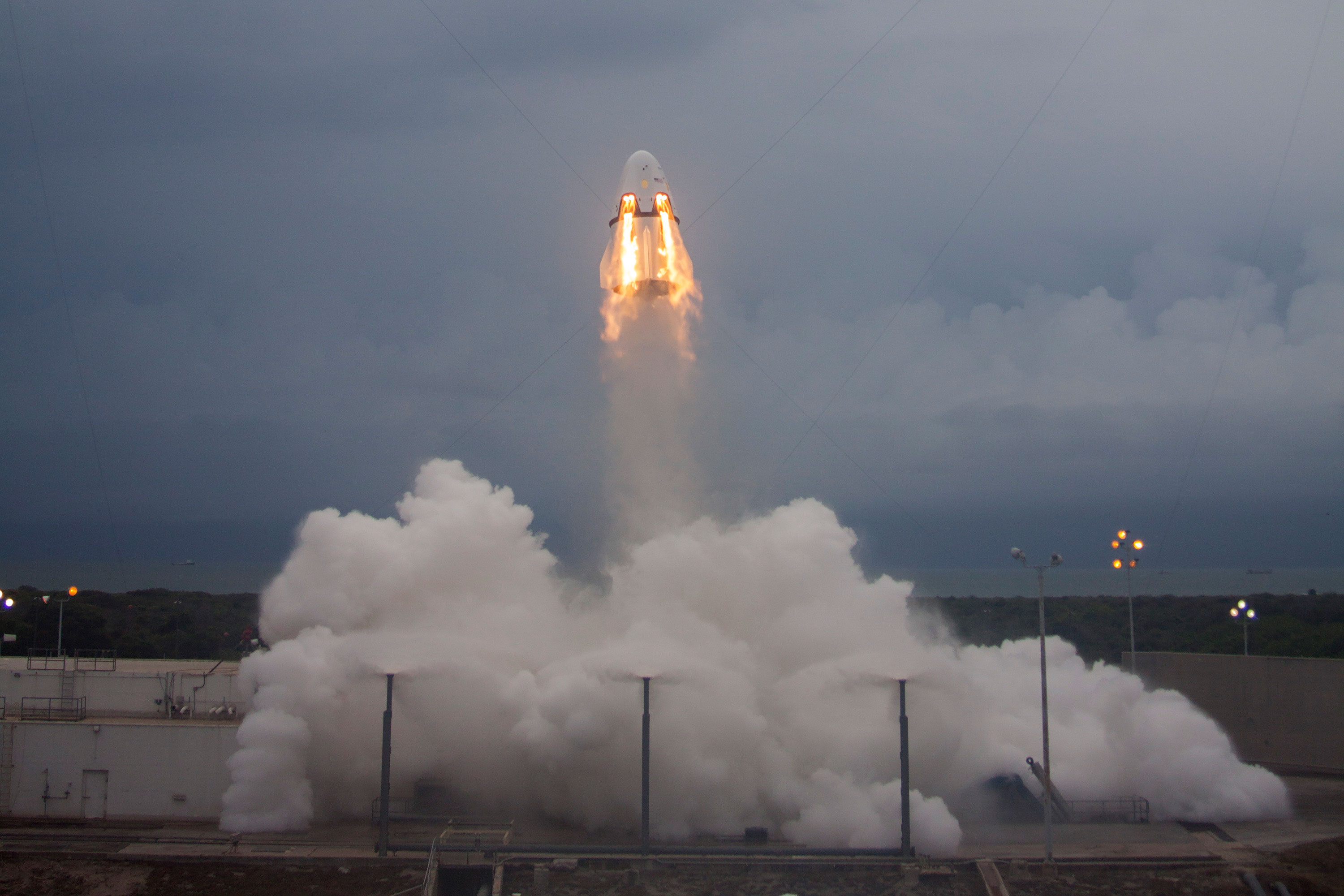
- Crew Dragon prototype DragonFly performing a pad abort demonstration.
- Manufacturer: SpaceX
- Country of origin: United States

Launch history
- Status: Operational

Crew Dragon Launch Abort System
- Powered by: 8 × SuperDraco (4 × pairs of 2)
- Maximum thrust: 71 kN
- Burn time: 25 seconds
- Propellant: N_{2}O_{4} / CH_{6}N_{2}

The Crew Dragon Launch Abort System is designed to propel the SpaceX Crew Dragon spacecraft away from a failing launch vehicle. It is equipped with 8 SuperDraco engines, each capable of generating 71 kN of thrust.

The abort system has several modes, or procedures for performing an abort in different phases of flight, including a pad abort, an in-flight abort, and the ability to use the abort system to fly into a lower than expected orbit should a failure occur late in flight.

== Design ==
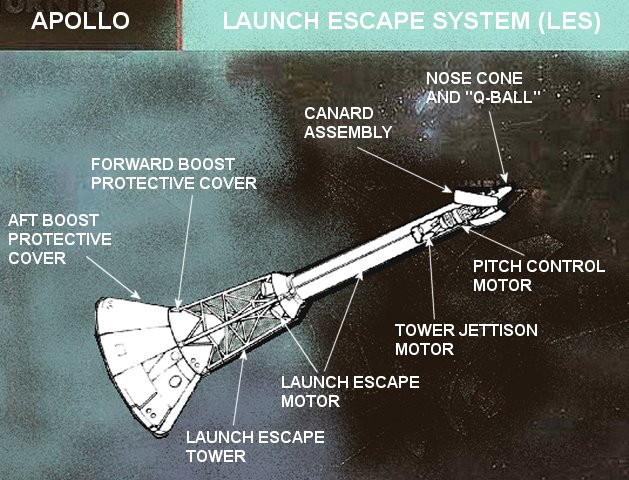
A figure showing the Apollo spacecraft's launch abort system.

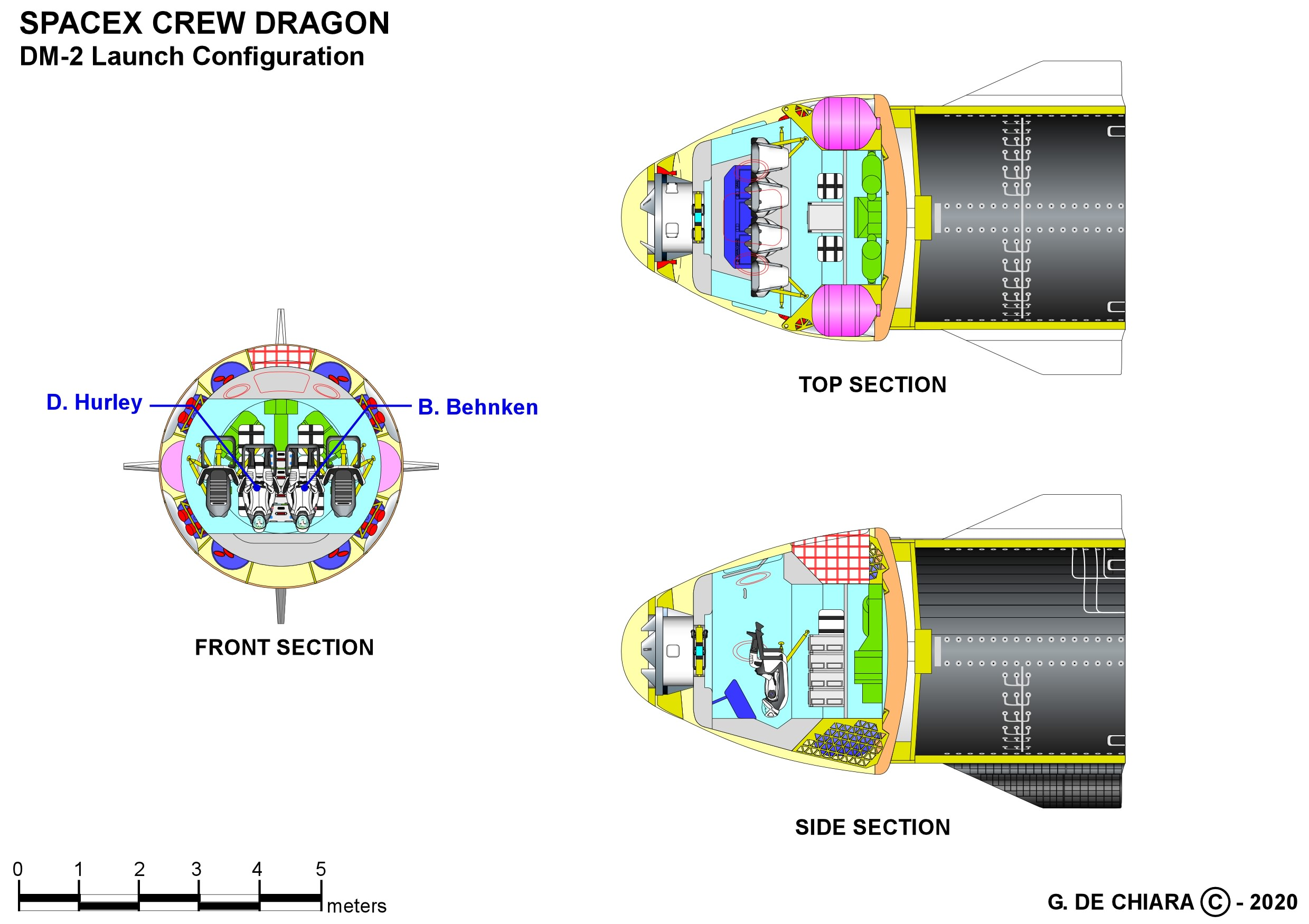
A diagram showing the configuration of Crew Dragon Endeavor during the Demo-2 mission.

Traditionally, spacecraft like Apollo and Soyuz have utilized solid-fueled "puller" launch escape systems, with the main spacecraft beneath a protective fairing attached to the escape system. Once in space, the escape system and the fairing are jettisoned, with the spacecraft's mode of abort switched to using its orbital maneuvering thrusters or upper stages. Crew Dragon, however, has its abort system permanently attached to the sides of the spacecraft.

Part of the reasoning behind this design is that it was originally planned to land dragon propulsively using the launch abort system. These plans were dropped after skepticism from NASA and the cancellation of SpaceX's Red Dragon capsule. However, the capability was introduced on Crew-8, though only in the event of a parachute failure. Additionally, the ability to keep the abort system attached to the rocket throughout the entire ascent rather than jettisoning the launch escape system after stage separation allows for an abort capability in all stages of flight, increasing crew safety.

Crew Dragon's "trunk", or cargo bay, also plays an important role in the abort sequence. Rather than leaving the trunk with the rocket like Apollo or Soyuz, Dragon keeps the trunk attached during an abort for aerodynamic stability.

== History ==
=== Pad Explosion ===
On 20 April 2019, Crew Dragon C204 was destroyed in an incident while testing its SuperDraco engines. A video leaked shortly after the incident shows the capsule exploding on a launch mount. NASA and SpaceX confirmed the explosion and stated that there were no injuries.

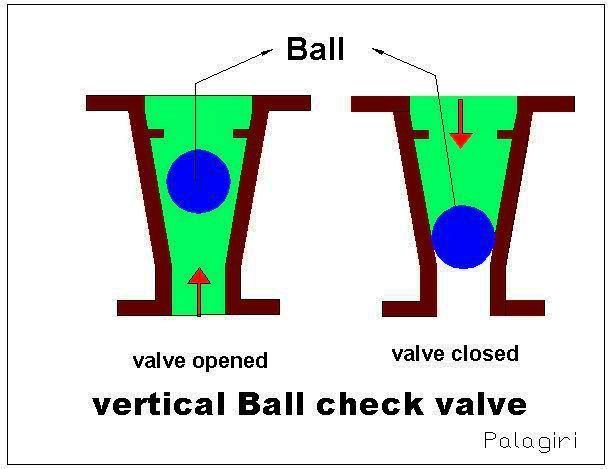
A diagram demonstrating a check valve.

Following an investigation, SpaceX stated that the explosion was the result of a faulty valve. During a nominal ignition sequence, valves keeping helium inside COPVs (Composite Overwrapped Pressure Vessels) are opened, causing the helium to flow through one-way check valves into the propellant tanks, pushing the fuel into the combustion chamber.

In this incident, however, the one-way oxidizer valve had allowed nitrogen tetroxide (NTO) to leak back through the helium tube. When the helium valve was opened, the "blobs" of NTO inside the helium line were accelerated at high speeds, slamming into and nearly instantaneously destroying the one-way oxidizer valve. The internal titanium components of the destroyed valve were then exposed to the NTO, resulting in combustion and the loss of the vehicle.

=== In-Flight Abort Test ===
A video of the in-flight abort test.

On 19 January 2020, SpaceX conducted a test of Crew Dragon's launch abort system.

After a successful liftoff, the launch abort sequence was initiated 1 minute and 26 seconds into flight. Crew Dragon C205 successfully separated with the Falcon 9 rocket, with the rocket breaking up seconds later under the intense aerodynamic forces of max-q.

After separating the trunk, Crew Dragon reached an apogee of 42 kilometers before splashing down in the Atlantic Ocean.

== Abort modes ==
The Crew Dragon has multiple abort modes for different phases of flight, each with its own landing zones and procedures. As the flight progresses, SpaceX mission control calls out switches between abort modes.

For typical launches, recovery zones are placed along the 51.64-degree inclination of the ISS, and can be targeted with higher levels of precision than spacecraft such as Orion and Shenzhou due to the throttling abilities of the SuperDraco engines. The recovery areas for a 2a type abort are along the East Coast of the United States and The Maritimes on Canada's Atlantic coast, with a 2b abort landing the Crew Dragon capsule near Nova Scotia and the 2c and 2d abort modes resulting in a landing in Western Ireland. 1a and 1b aborts result in landings near the American East Coast.

Time	Phase	Recovery zone
T − 37 minutes	Pad abort	Launch abort armed; recovery zone in Florida coast
T + 00 minutes 00 seconds	Stage 1a	Recovery zones from Florida coast to North Carolina
T + 01 minutes 15 seconds	Stage 1b	Recovery zones along Virginia coast
T + 02 minutes 32 seconds	Stage 2a	Stage separation; recovery zones along North American east coast
T + 08 minutes 05 seconds	Stage 2b	Retrograde burn to land near Nova Scotia
T + 08 minutes 28 seconds	Stage 2c	Prograde burn to land west of Ireland
T + 08 minutes 38 seconds	Stage 2d	Retrograde burn to land west of Ireland
T + 08 minutes 44 seconds	Stage 2e	Uses SuperDracos and Dracos to abort to orbit

== See also ==
- Crew Dragon in-flight abort test, a post-launch abort test of the SpaceX Crew Dragon spacecraft
- Crew Dragon pad abort test, a test of Dragon's abort system while on the launch pad
- SpaceX Dragon, a family of SpaceX spacecraft
