= Crew Dragon C205 =

Space capsule

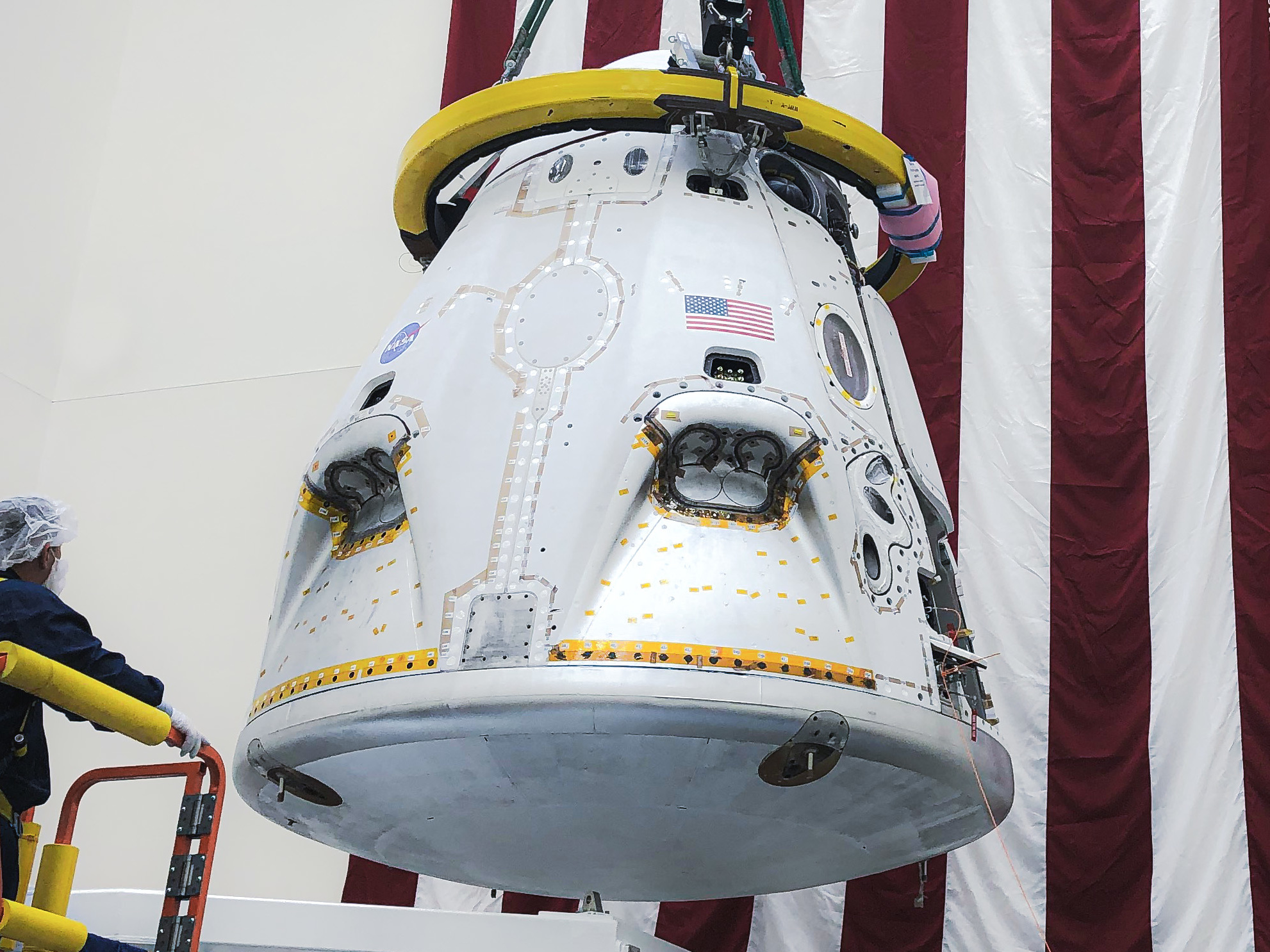
- C205 at Cape Canaveral in January 2020.
- Type: Space capsule
- Class: Dragon 2
- Owner: SpaceX
- Manufacturer: SpaceX

Specifications
- Dimensions: 4.4 m × 3.7 m (14 ft × 12 ft)
- Power: Solar panel
- Rocket: Falcon 9 Block 5

History
- Location: Unknown
- First flight: 19 January 2020; SpaceX In-Flight Abort Test
- Flights: 1
- Flight time: 8 minutes, 54 seconds

Dragon 2s

Crew Dragon C205 is a Crew Dragon capsule manufactured and built by SpaceX. It completed its only flight on January 19, 2020, with the Crew Dragon In-Flight Abort Test mission where the capsule detached from the Falcon 9 B1046 booster at max q using the SuperDraco abort thrusters. This was done to test the functionality of the abort thrusters in an operational rocket launch.

== Background ==
Dragon C205 was originally planned to be used on the Demo-2 mission and the Crew Dragon C204 capsule was intended to be used for the in flight abort test. However, the Dragon C204 capsule was destroyed during testing which caused SpaceX to change the Dragon C205 to this mission and Crew Dragon Endeavour completed the Demo-2 mission.

== In-Flight Abort Test ==
The In-Flight Abort Test was completed as part of the CCDev by NASA to test the Dragon 2's launch escape system with the SuperDraco thrusters, before a Crew Dragon capsule could carry astronauts onboard for the Demo-2 mission. The flight path of the rocket was set to imitate a crewed launch in order to match stresses of a normal flight. The launch escape test started with the rocket liftoff at 15:30 (UTC). The launch abort was triggered 90 seconds after liftoff, with C205 splashing down in the Atlantic Ocean at 15:38 (UTC) after descending under parachutes.

=== Recovery ===
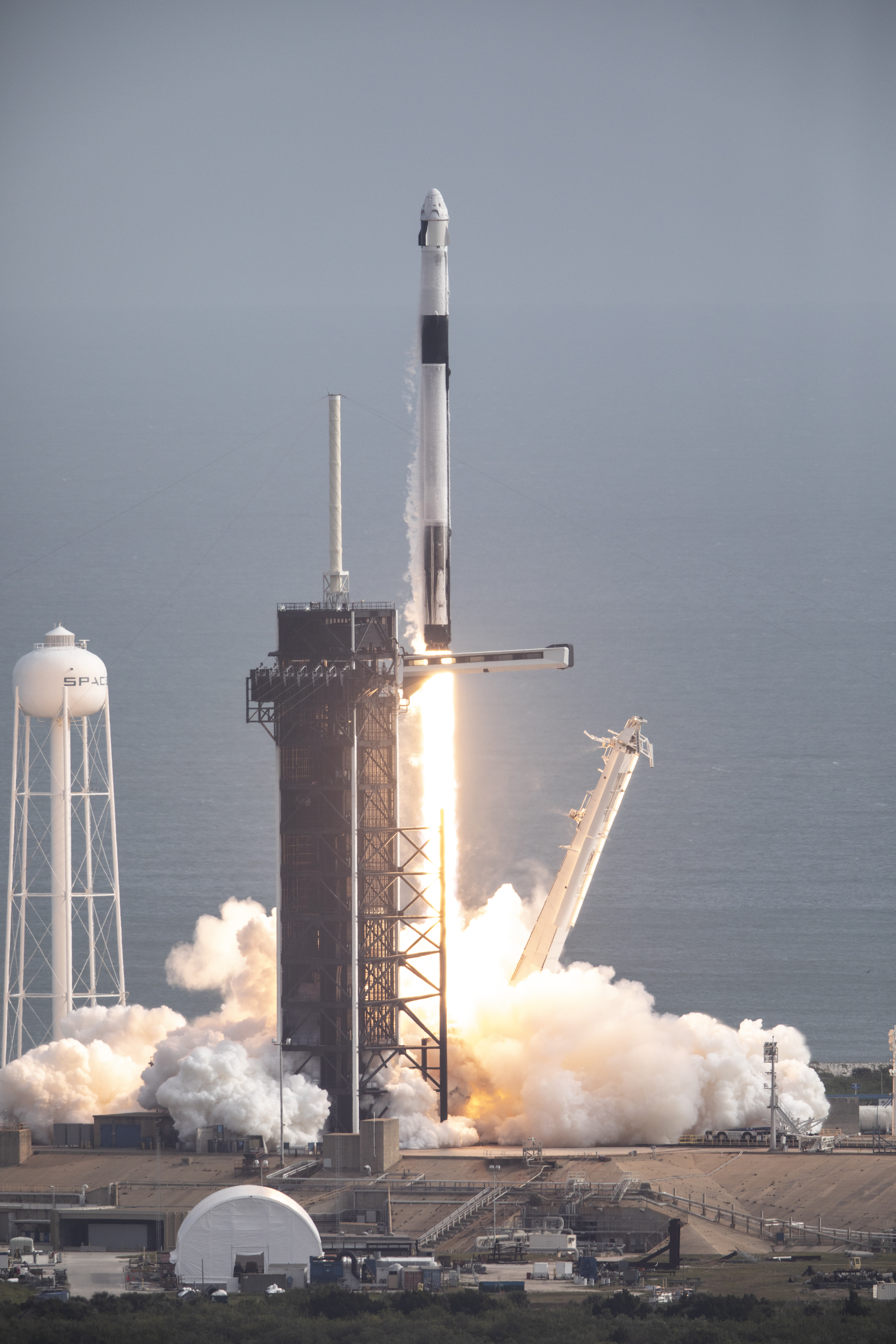
C205 launches on its only mission, the Crew Dragon In-Flight Abort Test.

The SpaceX recovery ship GO Navigator recovered the capsule where C205 was taken back to Port Canaveral for inspection. While the trunk which separated from the capsule at the flight path apogee of approximately 40 km was recovered by a second recovery ship GO Searcher, which returned to the port after the first ship carrying the capsule.

== Flights ==
| Mission | Patch | Launch date (UTC) | Duration | Notes | Outcome |
|---|---|---|---|---|---|
| Crew Dragon In-Flight Abort Test | | 19 January 2020, 15:30:00 | 8 minutes | A mission to test the SuperDraco abort thrusters in a launch situation as part of the CCDev program. | Success |

== See also ==
- Crew Dragon In-Flight Abort Test
- Development of the Commercial Crew Program
- Crew Dragon Endeavour
- Crew Dragon C201
