= Crew Dragon In-Flight Abort Test =

Post-launch abort test of the SpaceX Dragon 2 spacecraft

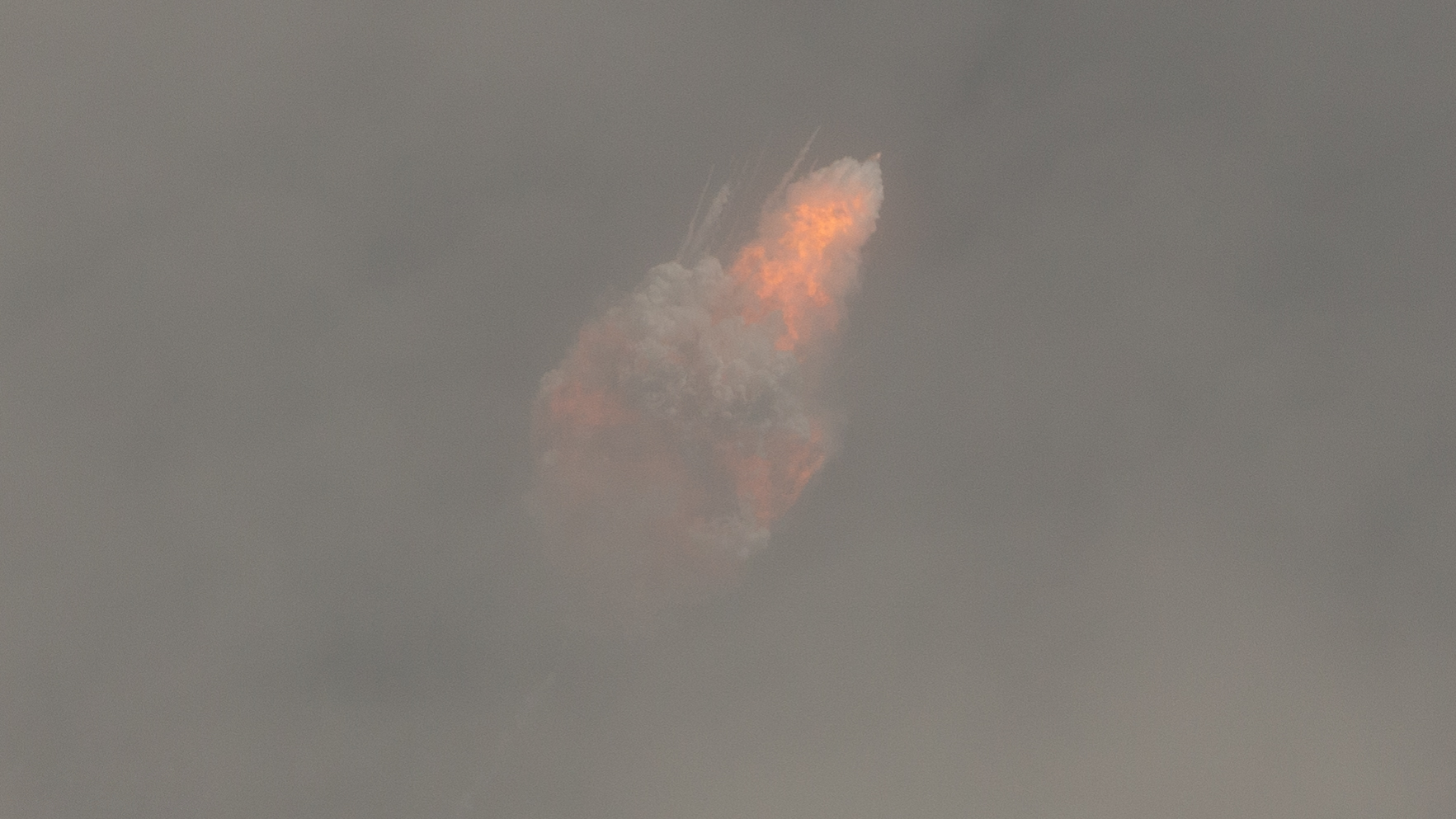
- Falcon 9 booster B1046.4 is destroyed by aerodynamic forces following the ejection of Crew Dragon C205
- Names: SpaceX In-Flight Abort Test; Crew Dragon Launch Escape Demonstration
- Mission type: Technology demonstration
- Operator: SpaceX
- Mission duration: 8 minutes and 54 seconds
- Apogee: 42 km (138,000 ft)

Spacecraft properties
- Spacecraft: Crew Dragon C205
- Spacecraft type: Crew Dragon
- Manufacturer: SpaceX

Start of mission
- Launch date: 19 January 2020, 15:30:00 UTC (10:30 am EST)
- Rocket: Falcon 9 Block 5 B1046-4
- Launch site: Kennedy, LC‑39A

End of mission
- Recovered by: Capsule: MV GO Searcher; Trunk: MV GO Navigator
- Landing date: 19 January 2020, 15:38:54 UTC (10:38:54 am EST)
- Landing site: Atlantic Ocean
- Mission patch Commercial Crew Development Crew Dragon flights

The Crew Dragon In-Flight Abort Test (also known as Crew Dragon Launch Escape Demonstration) was a successful test of the SpaceX Dragon 2 abort system, conducted on 19 January 2020. It was the final assessment for the Crew Dragon capsule and Falcon 9 launch system before they would be certified to carry humans into space. Booster B1046.4 and an uncrewed capsule C205 were launched from Launch Complex 39A (LC-39A) on a suborbital trajectory, followed by an in-flight abort of the capsule at max Q and supersonic speed. The test was carried out successfully: the capsule pulled itself away from the booster after launch control commanded the abort, and landed safely.

== Background ==
For the Commercial Crew Program, NASA requires participating companies to include and test a launch escape system in their crew-carrying vehicles. Prior to this, the last time American crewed spaceflight implemented the capability to escape a rocket during an emergency or anomaly was on the Saturn IB launch vehicle during Skylab missions and Apollo-Soyuz. The Saturn's successor, the Space Shuttle, had no system to eject the crew compartment from the rest of the spacecraft and launch stack at any time after two-person test flights had ended, and had limited launch abort options. The Space Shuttle program had fourteen astronaut casualties during its 30-year duration, half of which occurred when a booster rocket failed during ascent. NASA heavily emphasized crew safety during successor programs. The need for an effective launch escape system was further amplified by the launch failure of Soyuz MS-10 in 2018, during which American astronaut Nick Hague and Russian cosmonaut Alexey Ovchinin had their lives saved by the rocket's abort system.

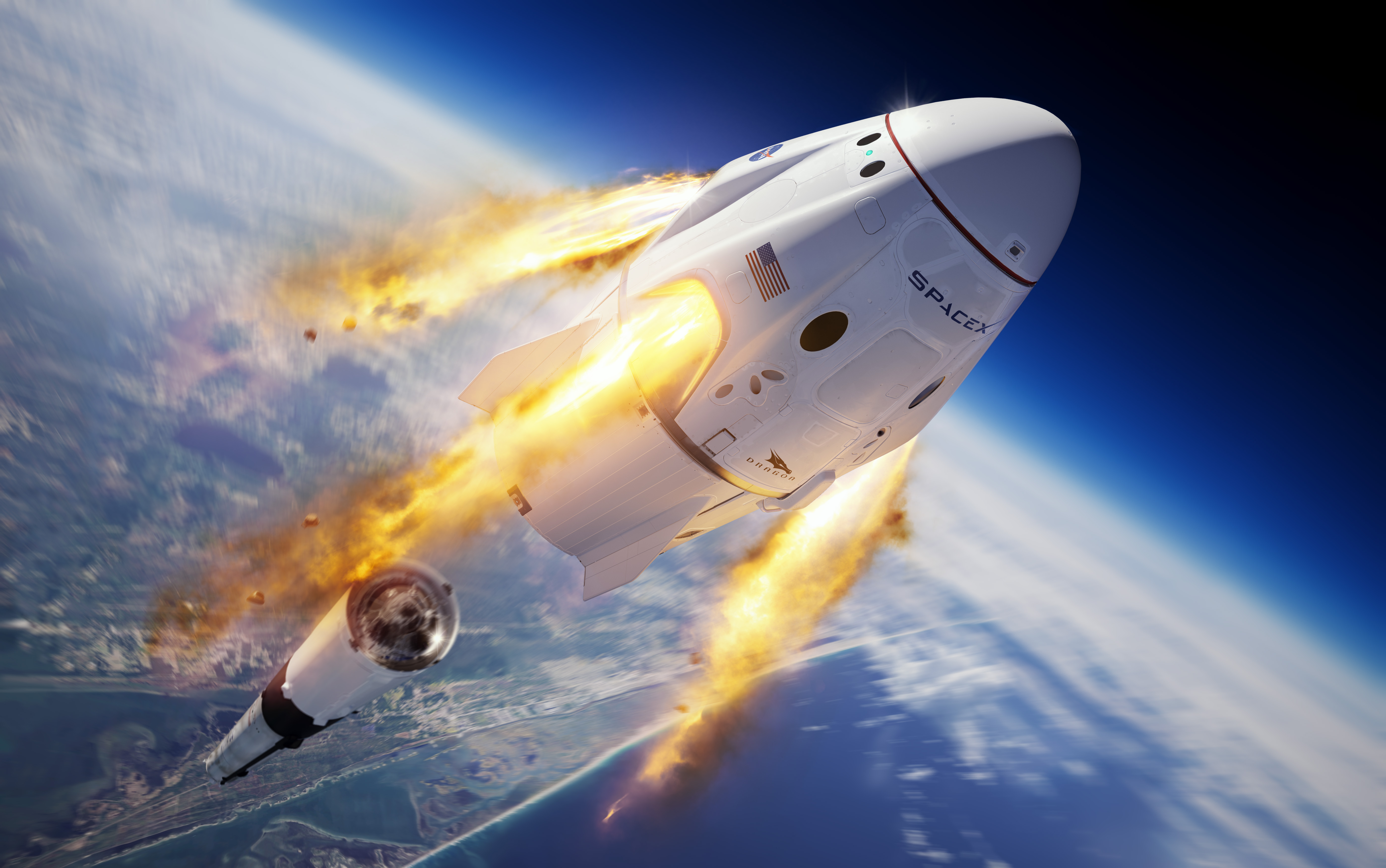
Illustration of a Crew Dragon launch abort

The SpaceX in-flight abort test was envisioned as a separation and abort scenario in the troposphere at transonic velocities during max Q, where the vehicle experiences maximum aerodynamic pressure. Dragon 2 would use its SuperDraco abort engines to push itself away from the Falcon 9 after an intentional premature engine cutoff. The vehicle would reorient, deploy parachutes and soft-land in the Atlantic Ocean. Earlier, this test had been scheduled before the uncrewed orbital test, however, SpaceX and NASA considered it safer to use a capsule capable of spaceflight rather than the test article from the pad abort test. The flight would have launched from Vandenberg Air Force Base SLC-4E on board a modified three-engine Falcon 9, which was possibly F9R Dev2.

After the change of plan, the test would have used the C204 capsule, which successfully flew Demo-1, however, C204 was destroyed in an explosion during a static fire test on 20 April 2019. Capsule C205, originally planned for Demo-2, replaced C204 in the In-Flight Abort Test; C206 was subsequently used for Demo-2. The capsule was fitted with sensors on its seats, which measured the forces exerted on the crew if they would go through a Dragon launch abort. NASA and SpaceX also decided to test the newly developed Mark 3 parachute system for Dragon this flight, as they deemed it much safer to use for crewed missions than the then-operational Mark 2.

The Dragon escape test was to be a full-scale simulation conducted on a previously flown Falcon 9. Originally, the flight-proven first stage chosen to be used for the test was B1048, but it was eventually decided to be B1046, the first of the human-rated Falcon 9 Block 5 boosters to be built and flown. The launch stack included a fully loaded second stage with a dummy weight instead of a functional vacuum engine.

As the flight was the final test before SpaceX and NASA were to fly crew to the International Space Station, it was used by all parties involved to practice various procedures surrounding the launch and abort. Prior to the actual abort test, NASA and SpaceX conducted an all-in simulation of events leading up to an actual crew launch, including crew suit-up and travel to the pad. For this test, preparing recovery vessels and personnel for emergency and contingency situations was deemed particularly important. After delaying because of weather and visibility issues, Falcon 9 lifted off at 15:30:00 UTC, at Kennedy Space Center from LC-39A, on January 19, 2020.

== Mission ==
Excerpts of the NASA-SpaceX joint webcast of the abort test (video)

The abort test was a full simulation of a malfunction on a nominal trajectory to the International Space Station. The abort was triggered by a command from ground control. At T+1:25 minutes, the booster engines shut down and the capsule separated itself from the booster. The abort was triggered at a speed of Mach 2.2. Dragon flew approximately 1 mi (1.6 km) away from Falcon within a few seconds and experienced a maximum acceleration force of around 3.5 Gs.

As expected, the rocket disintegrated into a fireball after its blunt end was exposed to the supersonic airstream following the escape of Dragon; as a result, the booster began tumbling and its propellant tanks gave way. The second stage was seen breaking apart from the booster in one piece, and it remained so until it impacted the ocean and exploded.

The capsule followed its suborbital trajectory to an apogee of around 138,000 ft (42 km), and jettisoned its trunk and fins into the ocean before positioning itself for descent and successfully deploying both drogue chutes and all four main parachutes. All major functions to be performed during abort were executed without anomalies. Capsule C205 splashed down at 15:38:54 UTC just off the Florida coast in the Atlantic Ocean. The capsule's unpressurized trunk section survived reentry and was recovered by GO Searcher in more or less intact condition, being the only Dragon trunk to survive a reentry and to be recovered successfully.

== See also ==
- Little Joe II
- Mercury-Atlas 3
- Crew Dragon Pad Abort Test
- Orion Pad Abort 1 and Ascent Abort 2
- Boeing Pad Abort Test
- Soyuz abort modes
- TV-D1
