= John Insprucker =

American engineer and Air Force colonel

- Born: John L. Insprucker; October 7, 1956 (age 70); Cincinnati, Ohio, U.S.
- Occupation: Aerospace Engineer
- Known for: Principal Integration Engineer at SpaceX
- Title: US Air Force Reserve Officer; Principal Integration Flight Engineer SpaceX

John L. Insprucker (born October 7, 1956) is an American aerospace engineer and retired Air Force colonel currently working at SpaceX as a Principal Integration Engineer. He is recognized on the National Air and Space Museum's Wall of Honor.

In 1978, at the age of 22, Insprucker joined the U.S. Air Force Reserve Officers Training Corps program at the University of Michigan. Throughout his career, he was dedicated to space launch operations, rocket development, and spacecraft design and deployment, Between 2000 and 2005, he served at Vandenberg Air Force Base Space Launch Complex-4, which is now leased by SpaceX.

== Career at Vandenberg Air Force Base ==
Insprucker began serving at Vandenberg in 1980 as a pad, payload, and rocket technician. During his first five years he contributed to the success of 17 Titan NIB and IIID/34D launches and 9 Agena upper stages. He then joined the Secretary of the Air Force's Special Project Office as head of the Spacecraft Attitude Control Division. During this time he participated in developing software used for reconnaissance satellites for the National Reconnaissance Office (NRO), where he was commended for saving a damaged satellite from an Attitude Control System (ACS) failure. While working with the NRO, Insprucker led a 60-person department to manufacture a $2.5 billion NRO Space system. He also served as a program manager for a $700M follow-on satellite. Between 2000 and 2005, he was stationed at Vandenberg Air Force Base where he successfully launched 11 Titan II and Titan IVB rockets first as the deputy program manager from 2000 to 2002, and then as commander of the Titan program from 2003 to 2004. On August 13, 2003, a Titan IVB at Cape Canaveral Launch Complex 40 suffered a nitrogen tetroxide leak caused by faulty fuel pump. Insprucker announced on October 3, 2003, that the leak resulted from a malfunction with the propellant pump and not an issue related to the Lockheed Martin propellant team. From December 13, 2003, through to November 30, 2005, he led operations for the Delta IV and Atlas V rockets. During this time, he was the director for the inaugural flight of the Delta IV Heavy, which was the most powerful active rocket at the time.

== Work at SpaceX ==
On 27 November 2006, Insprucker transitioned from a part-time to a full-time position at SpaceX, where Elon Musk entrusted him with overseeing the development of the Falcon 9. He currently serves as a Principal Integration Engineer at SpaceX.

Insprucker is a frequent host of SpaceX launch webcasts, including the COTS-2 demo flight (first private spacecraft to dock to the ISS), first re-flight of a rocket (SES-10), Falcon Heavy Demo Flight, the Dragon in-flight abort test, Demo-2 (first crewed SpaceX launch), as well as Starship test flights.
