= Crew Dragon Demo-1 =

Demonstration flight of the SpaceX Dragon 2

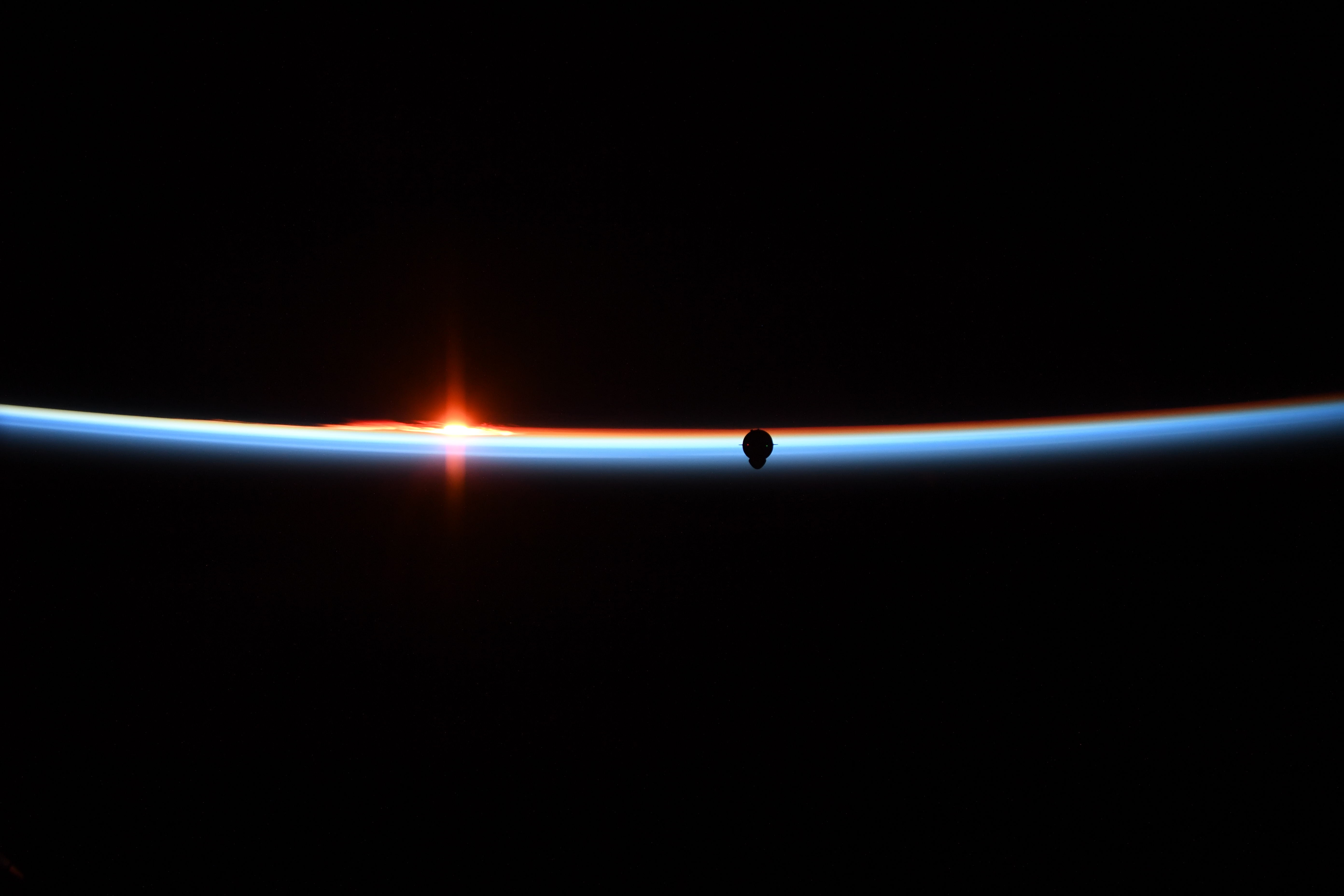
- Dragon C204 silhouetted against Earth's horizon, during its approach to the ISS
- Names: Crew Demo-1; SpaceX Demo-1; Demonstration Mission-1
- Mission type: Flight test
- Operator: SpaceX
- COSPAR ID: 2019-011A
- SATCAT no.: 44063
- Mission duration: 6 days, 5 hours, 56 minutes
- Orbits completed: 62

Spacecraft properties
- Spacecraft: Crew Dragon C204
- Spacecraft type: Crew Dragon
- Manufacturer: SpaceX
- Launch mass: 12,055 kg (26,577 lb)
- Dry mass: 6,350 kg (14,000 lb)

Start of mission
- Launch date: 2 March 2019, 07:49:03 UTC (2:49:03 am EST)
- Rocket: Falcon 9 Block 5 (B1051-1)
- Launch site: Kennedy, LC‑39A

End of mission
- Recovered by: MV GO Searcher
- Landing date: 8 March 2019, 13:45:08 UTC
- Landing site: Atlantic Ocean

Orbital parameters
- Reference system: Geocentric orbit
- Regime: Low Earth orbit
- Inclination: 51.66°

Docking with ISS
- Docking port: Harmony forward
- Docking date: 3 March 2019, 10:51 UTC
- Undocking date: 8 March 2019, 07:32 UTC
- Time docked: 4 days, 20 hours, 41 minutes
- Mission patch Commercial Crew Development Crew Dragon flights

Crew Dragon Demo-1 (officially Crew Demo-1, SpaceX Demo-1, or Demonstration Mission-1) (Note: This mission has multiple official names. Mission operator SpaceX refers to the mission as "Crew Demo-1", while customer NASA refers to the mission as "SpaceX Demo-1". Unless otherwise noted, this article uses "Demo-1" to refer to this mission.) was the first orbital test of the Dragon 2 spacecraft. The mission launched on 2 March 2019 at 07:49:03 UTC, and arrived at the International Space Station on 3 March 2019, a little over 24 hours after the launch. The mission ended with a splashdown on 8 March 2019 at 13:45:08 UTC.

During a separate test, on 20 April 2019, the capsule used on Crew Demo-1 was unexpectedly destroyed when firing the SuperDraco engines at Landing Zone 1.

== Mission ==
The spacecraft tested the approach and automated docking procedures with the International Space Station (ISS), consequent undocking from the ISS, full re-entry, splashdown and recovery steps to provide data requisite to subsequently qualify for flights transporting humans to the ISS. Life support systems were monitored throughout the test flight. The capsule was to be re-used in an in-flight abort test, but it was destroyed in an accident during a static fire test of its SuperDraco thrusters.

The mission was launched on a SpaceX Falcon 9 Block 5 launch vehicle contracted by NASA's Commercial Crew Program. Initial plans had hoped to see CCDev2 flights as early as 2015. Demo-1 was eventually slated for no earlier than December 2016, and then delayed several times throughout 2017. The first exact date was published by NASA in November 2018 to be 17 January 2019, but this was delayed until February 2019. The static fire took place on 24 January 2019 and the launch date was set to 23 February 2019. By the end of January 2019, the launch was delayed to no earlier than 2 March 2019 according to a FCC filing by SpaceX for Dragon 2 capsule telemetry, tracking, and command.

Demo-1 passed its Flight Readiness Review (FRR) and Launch Readiness Review (LRR) on 22 February 2019 and 27 February 2019 respectively.

The Falcon 9 with Demo-1 rolled out to the LC-39A on 28 February 2019 at around 15:00 UTC and went vertical a few hours later. The spacecraft was launched on 2 March 2019 at 07:49:03 UTC and docked with the ISS on 3 March 2019 at 10:51 UTC.

The Dragon 2 spacecraft undocked from the ISS on 8 March 2019 at 07:32 UTC. The capsule separated from the trunk, performed its de-orbit burn, entered the Earth's atmosphere and splashed down in the Atlantic Ocean about 320 km (200 mi) off Florida's east coast later that day at 13:45:08 UTC. The capsule was recovered using SpaceX's recovery ship GO Searcher and was returned to the mainland where it was examined and the data collected by the on board sensors was analyzed.

== Payload ==
Instead of carrying astronauts to the ISS, this flight had an Anthropomorphic Test Device (ATD) wearing SpaceX's custom flight suit. The ATD is named Ripley, as a homage to Sigourney Weaver's character in the Alien movies franchise. The capsule was weighted similarly to missions with astronauts onboard and carried about 180 kg (400 lb) of supplies and equipment including a "super high tech zero-g indicator" (a plush toy). The "zero-g indicator" was left on board the ISS after undocking, while Ripley returned safely to Earth on 8 March 2019.

== Gallery ==
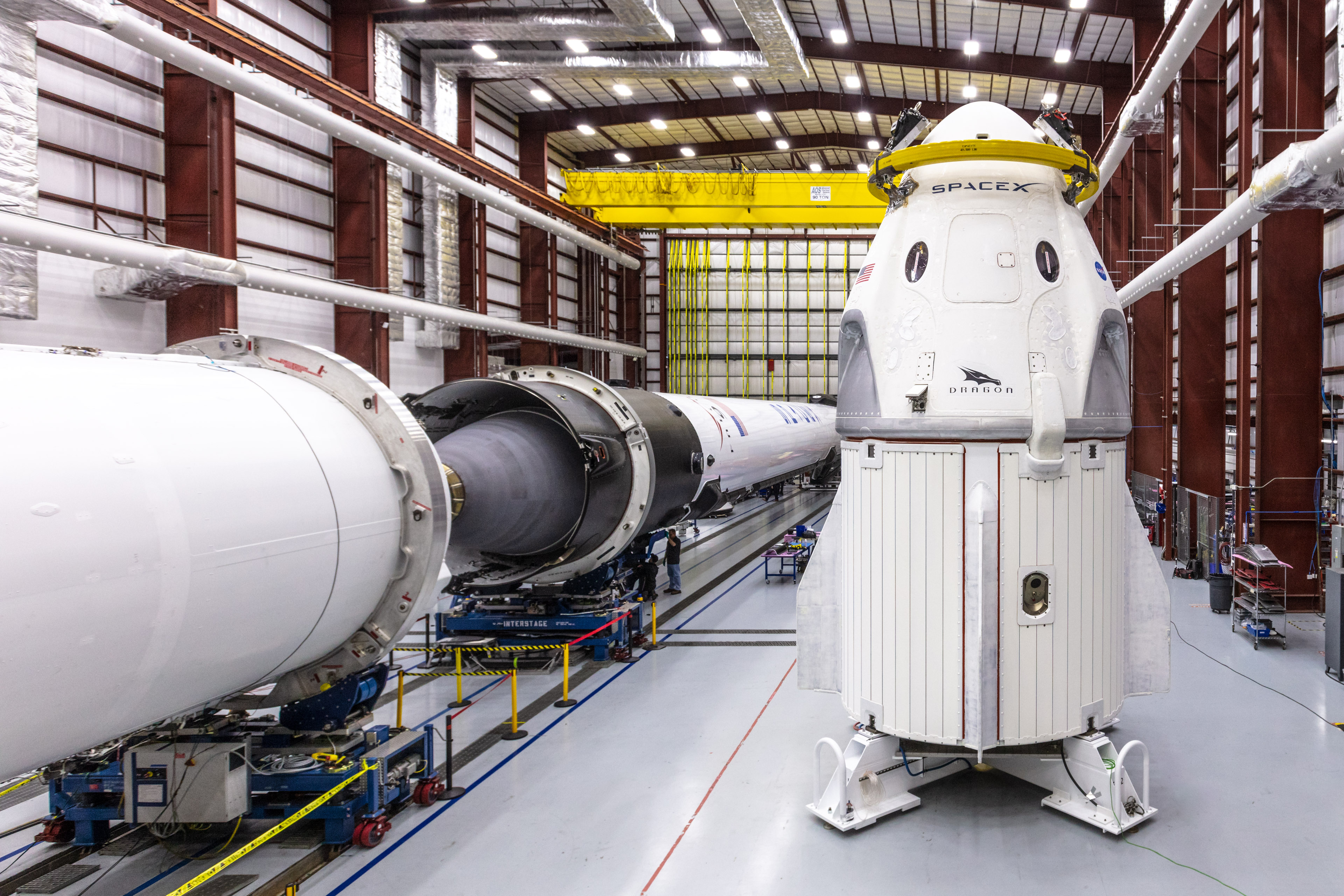
The Dragon 2 at SpaceX's LC-39A Horizontal Integration Facility

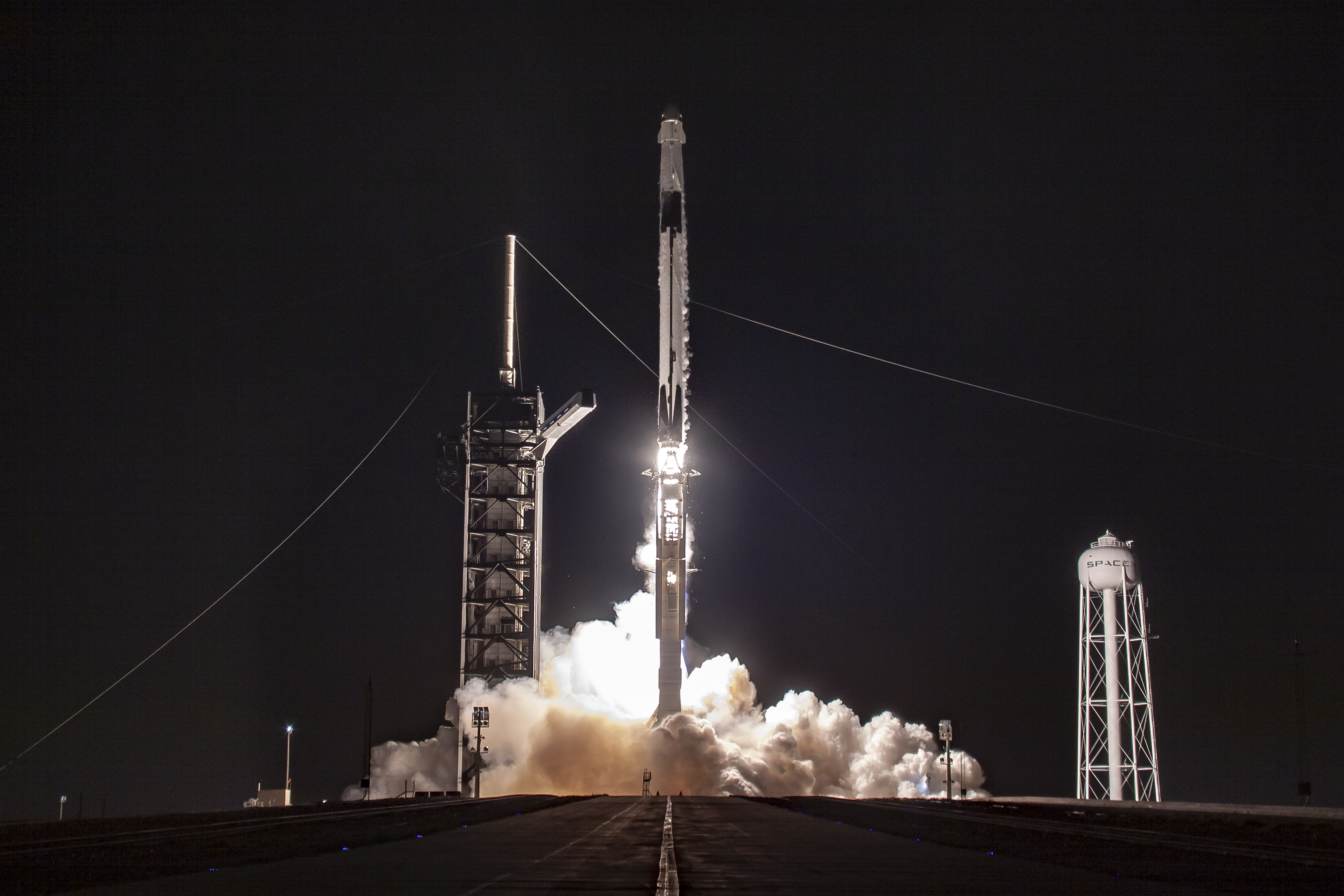
C204 launches from Kennedy LC-39A.

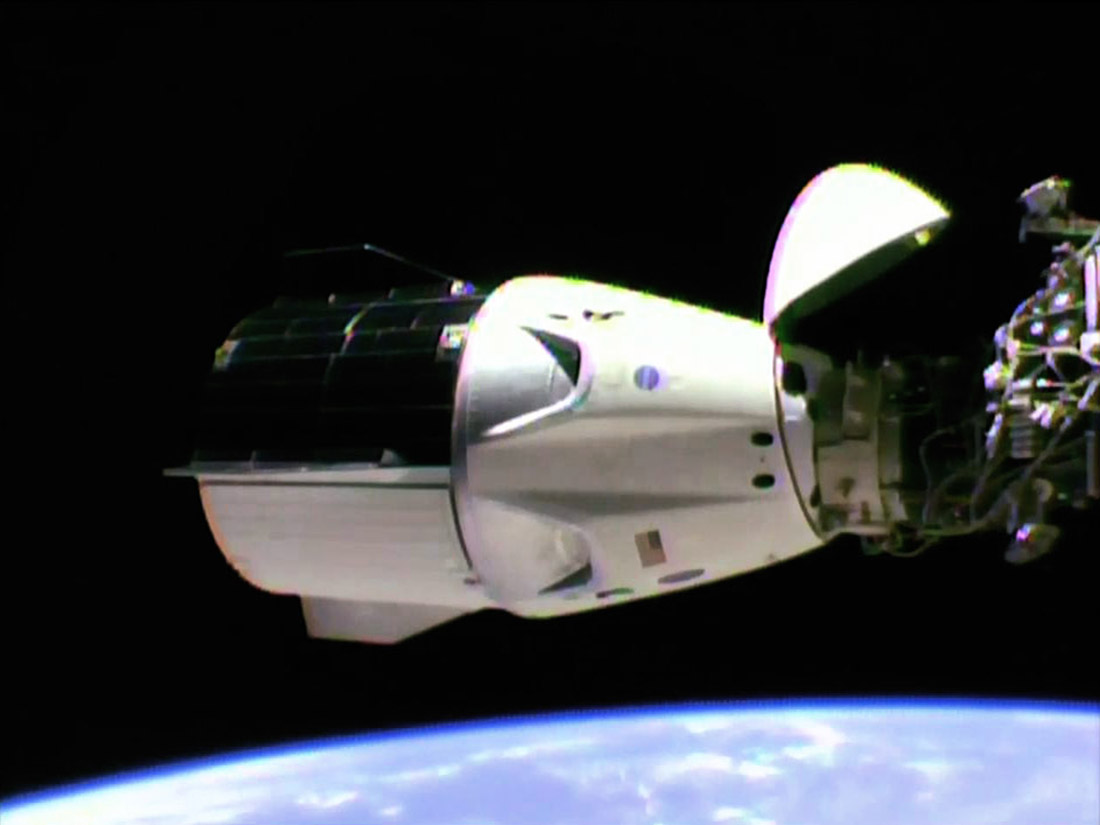
Dragon 2 docked to the International Space Station

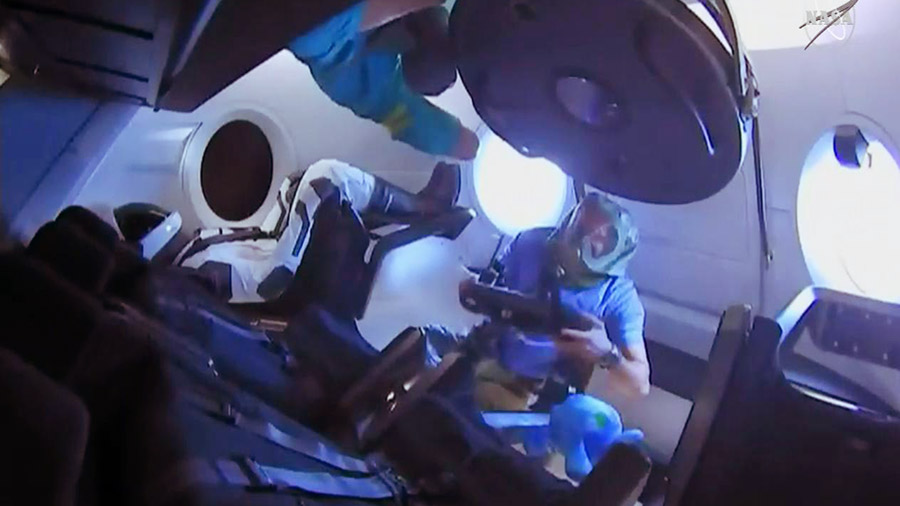
Expedition 58 crew members enter the Dragon 2 for the first time. They are wearing protective gear to avoid breathing particulate matter that may have shaken loose during launch.

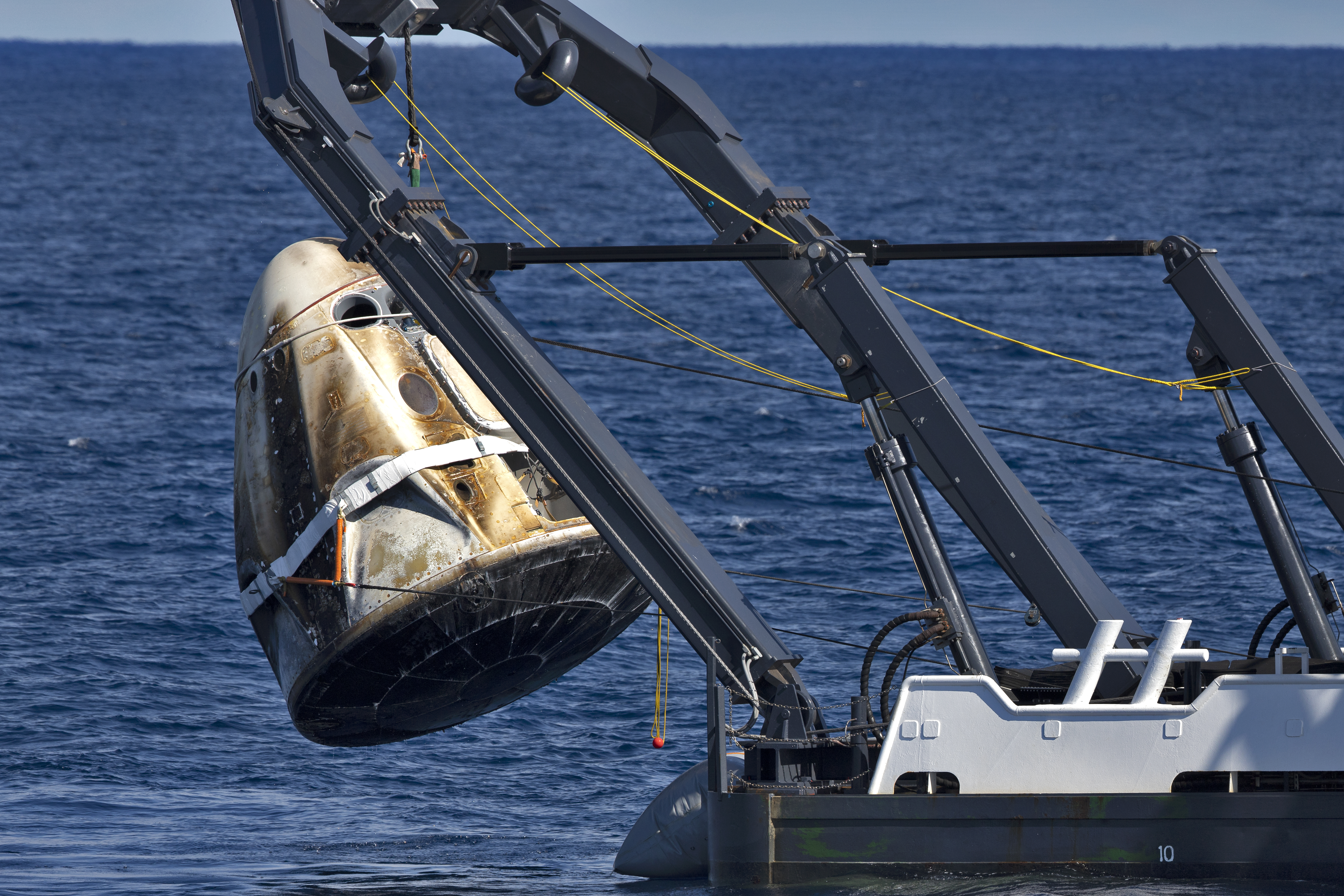
Dragon 2 being lifted from the water and onto vessel GO Searcher after the Demo-1 mission

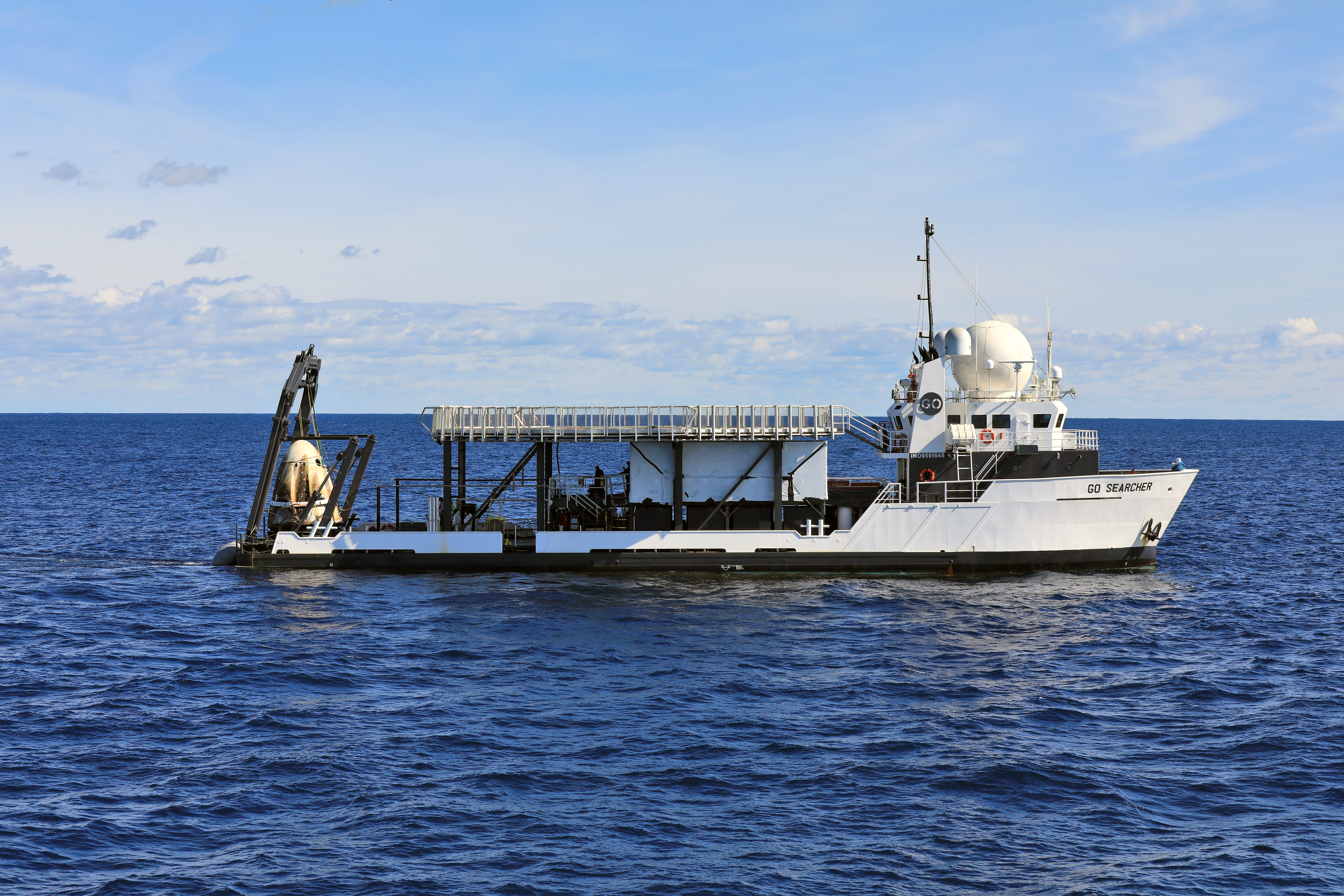
Dragon 2 sits on the vessel, about 200 miles off Florida’s east coast, after the Demo-1 mission

== See also ==
- Boeing Starliner
- Boeing Orbital Flight Test
- Boeing Orbital Flight Test 2
