= Falcon 9 B1046 =

Falcon 9 first stage booster

Falcon 9 B1046 (United States)

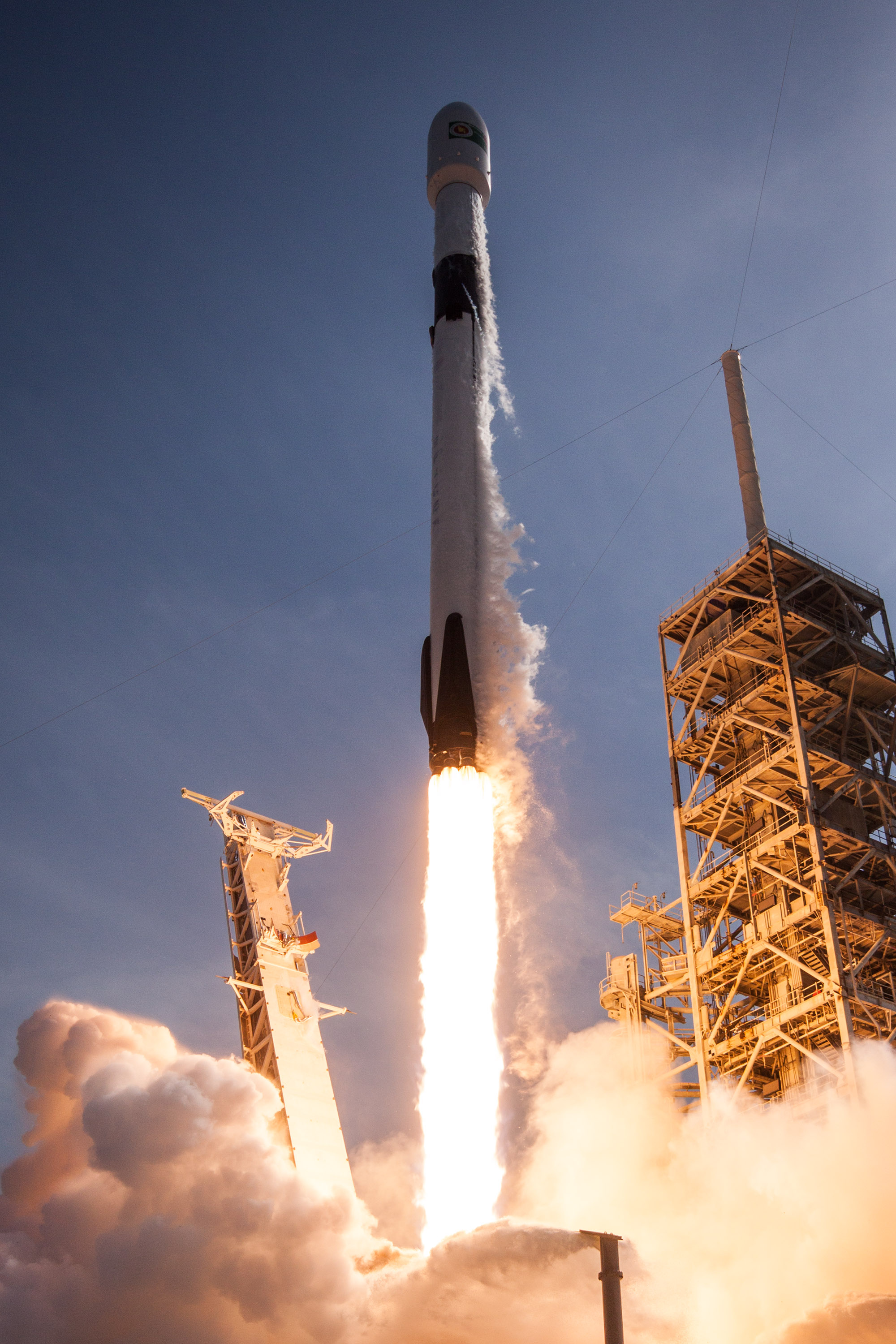
- B1046 launches Bangabandhu-1 from Launch Complex 39A, May 2018
- Type: First stage of orbital rocket
- Class: Falcon 9 Block 5
- Manufacturer: SpaceX

History
- First flight: May 11, 2018; Bangabandhu-1
- Last flight: January 19, 2020; Crew Dragon In-Flight Abort Test
- Flights: 4
- Fate: Disintegrated mid-air following its last flight

Falcon 9 B1046 was a reusable Falcon 9 first-stage booster manufactured by SpaceX. It flew four times between 2018 and 2020 before it was expended during a successful abort test of the Crew Dragon. It was the first rocket of the final Falcon 9 upgrade, Block 5.

== Manufacturing ==
In October 2016, Elon Musk announced the Falcon 9 Block 5, which featured revisions such as increased thrust, improved landing legs, and upgrades for easier reuse, including thermal protection on the side of the vehicle and a reusable heat shield at the base to protect the engines and plumbing.

After a year of delays, B1046 was completed and transported to SpaceX's McGregor facility for testing in preparation for its maiden flight.

== Flight history ==
This Falcon 9 was first launched on May 11, 2018. It carried Bangabandhu-1, Bangladesh's first geostationary communications satellite, from Kennedy Space Center. This marked the 54th flight of the Falcon 9 and the first flight of the Falcon 9 Block 5. After completing a successful ascent, B1046 separated from the second stage and landed on the drone ship Of Course I Still Love You. This marked the 11th successful landing on OCISLY and the 25th successful landing of the Falcon 9.

After inspection and refurbishment, B1046 was launched a second time on August 7, 2018, carrying the Telkom-4 (Merah Putih) satellite from Cape Canaveral Space Force Station. The Telkom-4 mission marked the first time an orbital-class rocket booster launched two GTO missions. This was also the first re-flight of a Block 5 booster.

Four months after the Telkom-4 mission, B1046 arrived at Vandenberg Air Force Base to support the SSO-A mission. Following delays for additional satellite checks, liftoff occurred from SLC-4E on December 3, 2018. This marked the first time that the same orbital-class booster flew three times. While the mission profile allowed for the booster to return to the launch site, it landed offshore on the drone ship Just Read The Instructions due to vibration concerns for a Delta IV Heavy and its NRO payload awaiting launch at nearby SLC-6.

On its fourth and last mission, it launched a Crew Dragon capsule from Kennedy Space Center, up to the point of maximum dynamic pressure, where the stack separated to test the capsule's abort system in flight. Flying in expendable configuration, the booster had its engines turned off during the most challenging part of the flight to imitate a critical anomaly, after which the Dragon successfully activated its escape engines. The booster was subsequently destroyed.

== Launches ==
Flight #	Launch date (UTC)	Mission #	Payload	Pictures	Launch pad	Landing location	Notes
1	May 11, 2018	54	Bangabandhu-1	Bangabandhu Satellite-1 Mission (42025498972)	KSC, LC-39A	Of Course I Still Love You (ASDS)	First flight of a Block 5 booster, launch of Bangladesh's first geostationary communications satellite
2	August 7, 2018	60	Merah Putih	Merah Putih (30041972208)	CCAFS, SLC-40	Of Course I Still Love You (ASDS)	First reflight of a Block 5 booster
3	December 3, 2018	64	Spaceflight SSO-A (SmallSat Express)		VAFB, SLC-4E	Just Read The Instructions (ASDS)	First third flight of the same orbital-class booster
4	January 19, 2020	79	Crew Dragon C205		KSC, LC-39A	No Attempt	High-speed abort test of Crew Dragon; no attempt at landing the booster as recovery was deemed too complicated due to the unorthodox nature of the test flight.

== B1046 records and achievements ==
- First Block 5 booster to fly
- Launched Bangladesh's first geostationary communications satellite
- First re-flight of a Block 5 booster
- First booster to fly two missions to geosynchronous transfer orbit
- First orbital-class booster to fly and land three times
- The first Falcon 9 to have launched from all three of SpaceX's active launch sites
- Largest batch of satellites launched from the United States (record subsequently broken)

== See also ==
- List of Falcon 9 first-stage boosters
- Grasshopper
- Blue Origin New Shepard
- McDonnell Douglas DC-X
