= Telkom-4 =

Indonesian communications satellite

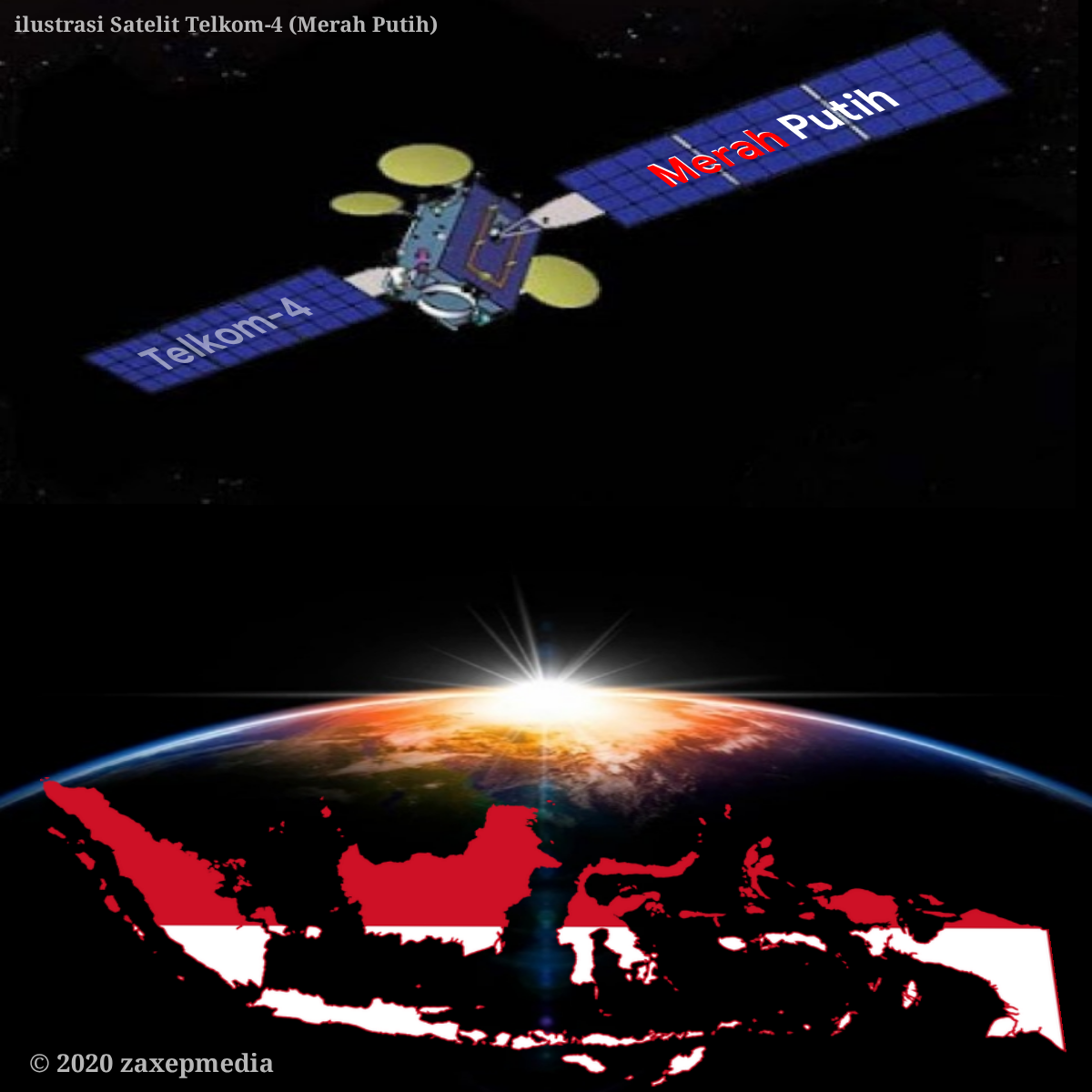
- Telkom-4 Merah Putih satellite
- Names: Merah Putih
- Mission type: Communications
- Operator: PT Telekomunikasi Indonesia Tbk
- COSPAR ID: 2018-064A
- SATCAT no.: 43587
- Website: https://telkomsat.co.id/id/
- Mission duration: 16 years (planned); 7 years, 8 months and 21 days (in progress)

Spacecraft properties
- Spacecraft: Merah Putih
- Spacecraft type: SSL 1300
- Bus: LS-1300
- Manufacturer: Space Systems/Loral
- Launch mass: 5,800 kg (12,800 lb)
- Dry mass: 2,000 kg (4,400 lb)

Start of mission
- Launch date: 7 August 2018, 05:18 UTC
- Rocket: Falcon 9 Block 5 B1046-2
- Launch site: Cape Canaveral, SLC-40
- Contractor: SpaceX
- Entered service: October 2018

Orbital parameters
- Reference system: Geocentric orbit
- Regime: Geostationary orbit
- Longitude: 108° East

Transponders
- Band: 60 C-Band
- Coverage area: Indonesia, Southeast Asia, South Asia, India

Telkom 4, also known as Merah Putih, is an Indonesian geostationary communication satellite built by Space Systems/Loral that is located at an orbital position of 108° East and is operated by PT Telekomunikasi Indonesia Tbk. The satellite is based on the SSL 1300 satellite bus and has a life expectancy of 16 years. It was launched on 7 August 2018, at 05:18 UTC or 12:18 Jakarta Time, using the SpaceX Falcon 9 Block 5 launcher from Cape Canaveral Air Force Station, Florida, United States.

== Satellite description ==
This satellite carries 60 active transponders consisting of 24 C-Band transponders and 12 Extended C-Band transponders which will serve the Southeast Asia region, including Indonesia, as well as 24 C-Band transponders which will reach the South Asia region. The satellite relies on the SSL 1300 satellite bus with a design life of 16 years with up to 21 years of fuel remaining. The development of the Merah Putih Satellite involves two U.S. companies, namely SSL as a satellite manufacturer and SpaceX as a launch service provider. The total mass of the satellite is 5,800 kilograms (12,800 lb). Telkom-4 is devoted to serving high-definition television (HDTV) broadcasts, GSM and Internet services.

== Launch ==
Telkom-4 was launched using the SpaceX Falcon 9 Block 5 first stage B1046.2 from Cape Canaveral Air Force Station (CCAFS), Florida, United States on 7 August 2018, at 01:18 UTC. The launch was the first time SpaceX reused one of the Block 5 variant of the Falcon 9 rocket boosters. After successfully separating from the second stage, the first stage landed on the SpaceX drone ship Of Course I Still Love You.

== Project cost ==
The launch of the Telkom-4 (Merah Putih) satellite saves around 25% of the cost of launching the previous satellite, the Telkom-3S satellite, which was launched on 15 February 2017, which cost US$215 million. Meanwhile, the Merah Putih satellite only costs US$165 million and includes insurance costs of US$10 million.

== Service users ==
Due to the inadequacy of the Palapa-D satellite to operate until July 2020, while the replacement satellite, Nusantara Dua (Palapa N1), failed to reach orbit, many TV and radio channels migrated from Palapa-D to Telkom-4. Below is a list of frequency of channels that have migrated as of July 2020:
