= SpaceX CRS-31 =

Fall 2024 cargo mission to the ISS

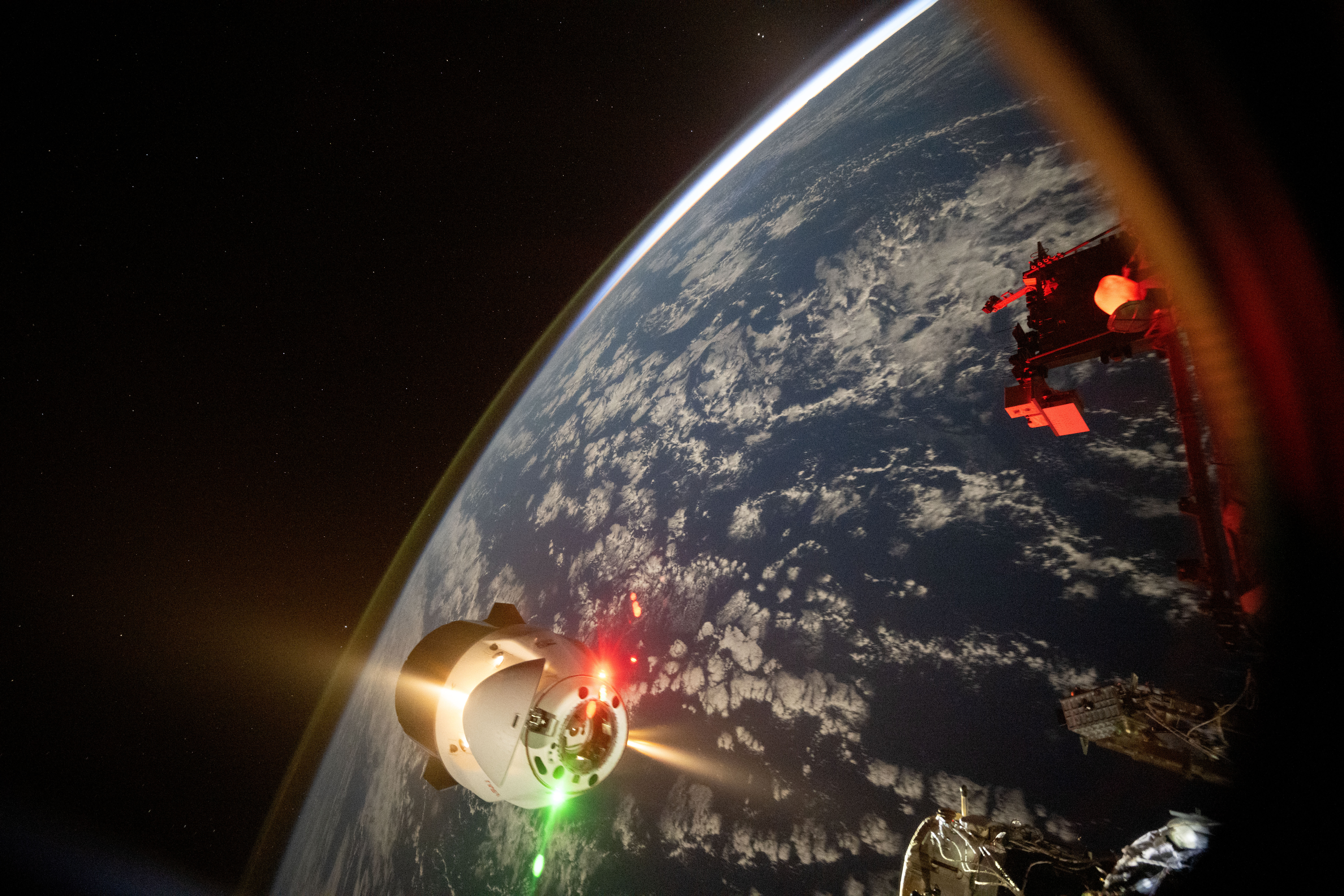
- Cargo Dragon C208 fires its thrusters as it backs away from the ISS at the conclusion of the CRS-31 mission on 16 December 2024
- Names: CRS SpX-31
- Mission type: ISS resupply
- Operator: SpaceX
- COSPAR ID: 2024-200A
- SATCAT no.: 61791
- Mission duration: 42 days, 16 hours and 9 minutes

Spacecraft properties
- Spacecraft: Cargo Dragon C208
- Spacecraft type: Cargo Dragon
- Manufacturer: SpaceX

Start of mission
- Launch date: 5 November 2024, 02:29:31 UTC (4 November, 9:29:31 pm EST)
- Rocket: Falcon 9 Block 5 B108-5
- Launch site: Kennedy, LC-39A

End of mission
- Recovered by: MV Megan
- Landing date: 17 December 2024, 18:39:30 UTC (1:39:30 pm EST)
- Landing site: Gulf of Mexico

Orbital parameters
- Reference system: Geocentric orbit
- Regime: Low Earth orbit
- Inclination: 51.66°

Docking with ISS
- Docking port: Harmony forward
- Docking date: 5 November 2024, 14:52:11 UTC
- Undocking date: 16 December 2024, 16:05 UTC
- Time docked: 41 days, 1 hour and 12 minutes

Cargo
- Mass: 2,762 kg (6,089 lb)
- Pressurised: 2,435 kg (5,368 lb)
- Unpressurised: 327 kg (721 lb)
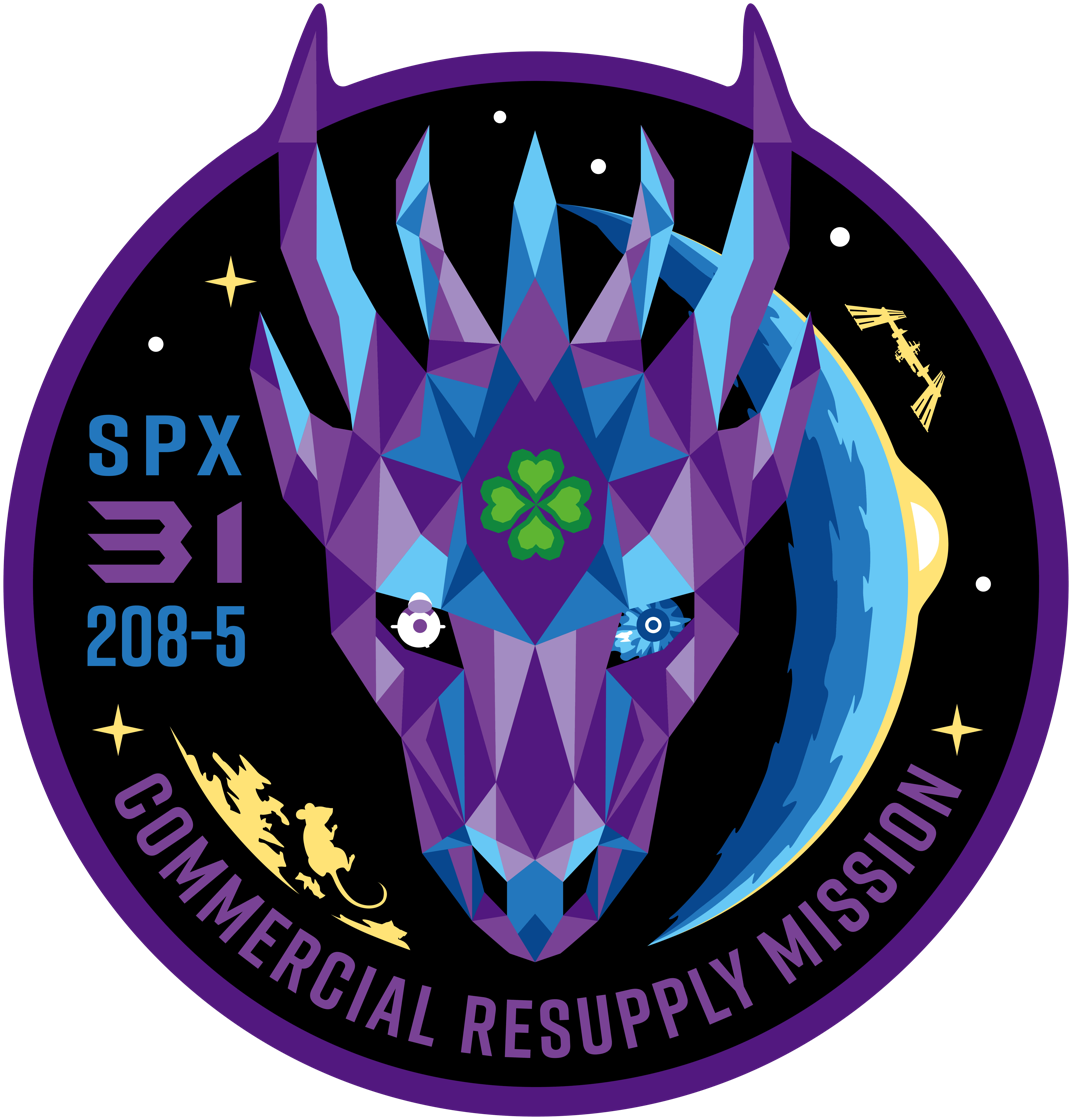
- SpaceX CRS-31 Mission patch Commercial Resupply Services Cargo Dragon flights

SpaceX CRS-31, sometimes identified by NASA as CRS SpX-31, was an American cargo spacecraft flight to the International Space Station (ISS), which launched on 5 November 2024. The mission was operated by SpaceX under a Commercial Resupply Services (CRS) contract with NASA. The spacecraft was a Cargo Dragon, serial number C208. This mission marked capsule C208's fifth flight.

== Launch ==
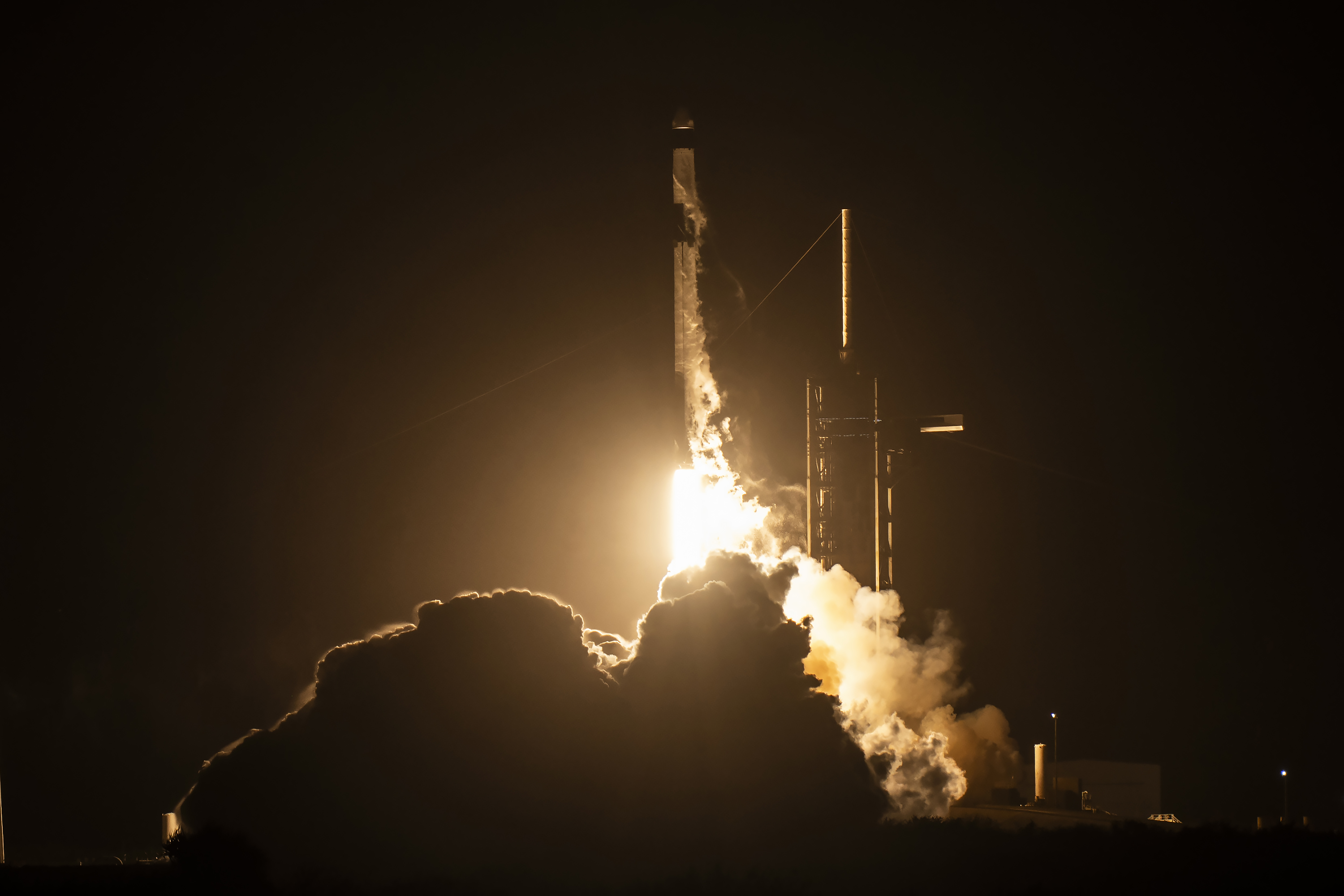
SpaceX Falcon 9 rocket carrying the Dragon spacecraft lifts off from Launch Complex 39A

CRS-31 launched from Launch Complex 39A at Kennedy Space Center on 5 November 2024 at 02:29:31 UTC (4 November, 9:29:31 pm EST, local time at the launch site).

== Manifest ==
The Cargo Dragon spacecraft was loaded with a total of 2,762 kg (6,089 lb) of cargo and supplies before its launch, including 2,435 kg (5,368 lb) of pressurised and 327 kg (721 lb) of unpressurised cargo.

The cargo manifest is broken down as follows:

- Crew supplies: 961 kg (2,119 lb)
- Science investigations: 917 kg (2,022 lb)
- Spacewalk equipment: 171 kg (377 lb)
- Vehicle hardware: 238 kg (525 lb)
- Computer resources: 20 kg (44 lb)

== Research ==
Various experiments were transported to the orbiting laboratory aboard the Cargo Dragon. These are four of the projects highlighted by NASA:

=== Measuring solar wind ===
The CODEX (Coronal Diagnostic Experiment) examines the solar wind, creating a globally comprehensive data to help scientists confirm theories for what heats the solar wind – which is a million degrees hotter than the Sun's surface – and sends it streaming out at almost a million miles per hour.

The investigation uses a coronagraph, an instrument that blocks out direct sunlight to reveal details in the outer atmosphere or corona. The instrument takes multiple daily measurements that determine the temperature and speed of electrons in the solar wind, along with the density information gathered by traditional coronagraphs. A diverse international team has been designing, building, and testing the instrument since 2019 at NASA's Goddard Space Flight Center in Greenbelt, Maryland.

=== Antarctic moss in space ===
A radiation-tolerance experiment, ARTEMOSS, uses a live Antarctic moss, Ceratodon purpureus, to study how some plants better tolerate exposure to radiation and to examine the physical and genetic response of biological systems to the combination of cosmic radiation and microgravity. Little research has been done on how these two factors together affect plant physiology and performance, and results could help identify biological systems suitable for use in bioregenerative life support systems on future missions.

Mosses grow on every continent on Earth and have the highest radiation tolerance of any plant. Their small size, low maintenance, ability to absorb water from the air, and tolerance of harsh conditions make them suitable for spaceflight. NASA chose the Antarctic moss because that continent receives high levels of radiation from the Sun.

=== Exposing materials to space ===
The Euro Material Ageing investigation from the European Space Agency includes two experiments studying how certain materials age while exposed to space. The first experiment, developed by Centre National d'Études Spatiales, includes materials selected from 15 European entities. The second experiment looks at organic samples and their stability or degradation when exposed to ultraviolet radiation not filtered by Earth's atmosphere.

Predicting the behavior and lifespan of materials used in space can be difficult because facilities on the ground cannot simultaneously test for all aspects of the space environment. The exposed samples are recovered and returned to Earth.

=== Repairing spacecraft from the inside ===
Nanolab Astrobeat investigates using cold welding to repair perforations in the outer shell or hull of a spacecraft from the inside. Less force is needed to fuse metallic materials in space than on Earth, and cold welding could be an effective way to repair spacecraft.

Some micrometeoroids and space debris traveling at high velocities could perforate the outer surfaces of spacecraft, possibly jeopardizing mission success or crew safety. The ability to repair impact damage from inside a spacecraft may be more efficient and safer for crew members. Results also could improve applications of cold welding on Earth as well.

== ISS reboost ==
CRS-31 was the first Dragon to perform an ISS "reboost". On 8 November 2024 at 17:50 UTC, Cargo Dragon C208 fired its aft-facing Draco thrusters at 0.3 m/s (0.98 ft/s) for 12.5 minutes adjusting the station’s orbit by 0.07 miles (0.11 km) at apogee and 0.7 miles (1.1 km) at perigee. Periodic reboosts counteract atmospheric drag on the station. The American Cygnus and Russian Progress cargo spacecraft also regularly perform reboosts during missions to the ISS.

This reboost test will aid in developing the SpaceX United States Deorbit Vehicle as changes in orbit, trajectory and velocity will be carefully observed. NASA is also believed to be testing its ability to maneuver the station with just Cygnus and Dragon spacecraft in the event that the Russian Orbital Segment, which historically has handled reboosting and maneuvering the station, is abandoned or separated from the US Orbital Segment.

== See also ==
- Uncrewed spaceflights to the International Space Station
