= Crew Dragon C204 =

SpaceX Crew Dragon spacecraft

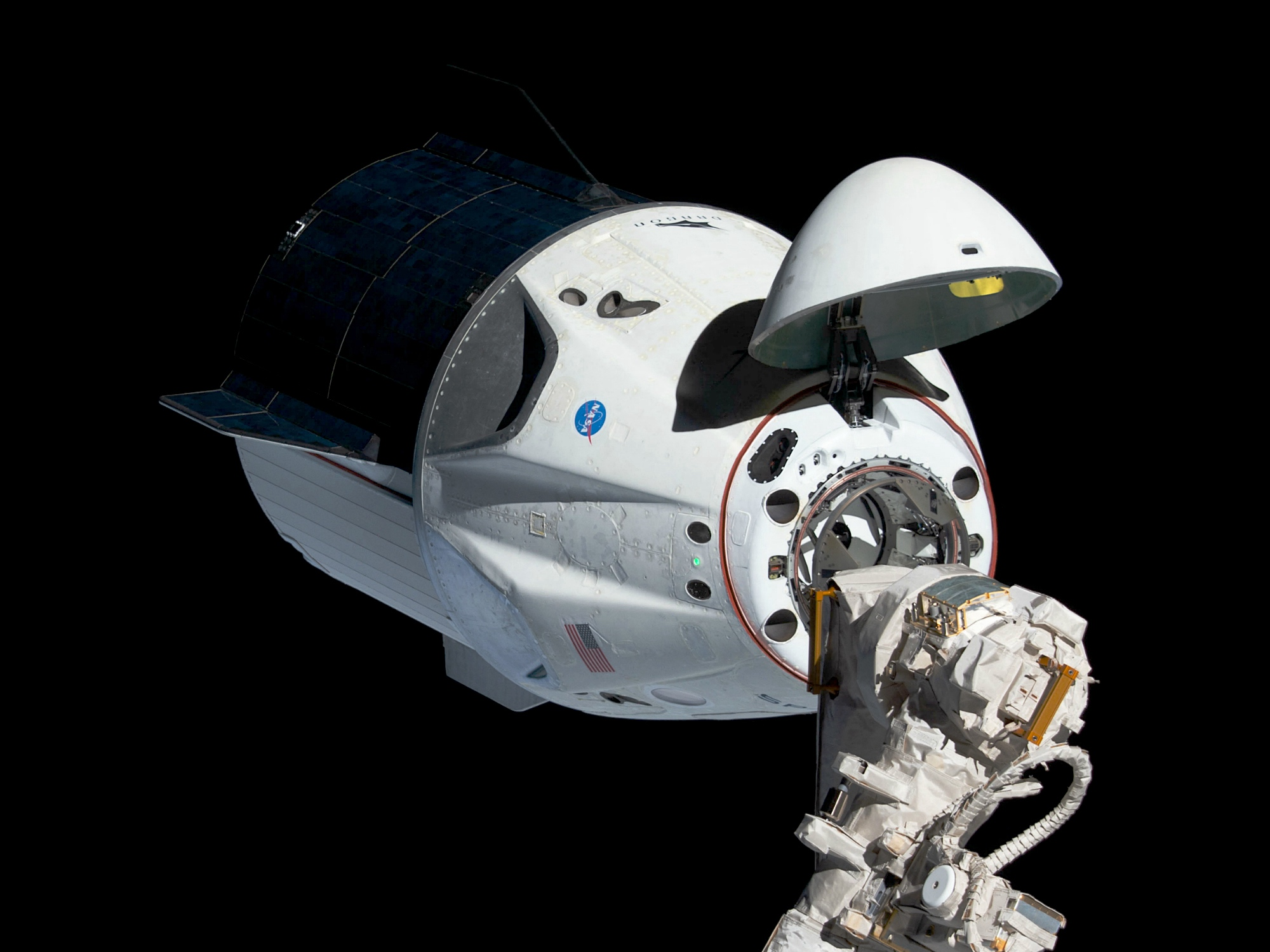
- C204 approaching the ISS
- Type: Space capsule
- Class: Dragon 2
- Owner: SpaceX
- Manufacturer: SpaceX

Specifications
- Dimensions: 4.4 m × 3.7 m (14 ft × 12 ft)
- Power: Solar panel
- Rocket: Falcon 9 Block 5

History
- First flight: 2–8 March 2019; SpaceX Demo-1
- Flights: 1
- Flight time: 116 hours
- Fate: Destroyed during testing

Dragon 2s

Crew Dragon C204 was part of Crew Dragon flight vehicle SN 2-1 (sometimes incorrectly called C201) manufactured and operated by SpaceX and used by NASA's Commercial Crew Program. Used in the uncrewed Demo-1 mission, it was launched atop a Falcon 9 rocket on 2 March 2019, arriving at the International Space Station on 3 March 2019. It was the first orbital test flight of the Dragon 2 spacecraft. The spacecraft was unexpectedly destroyed on 20 April 2019 during a separate test when firing the SuperDraco engines at Landing Zone 1.

== History ==
SpaceX was contracted by NASA to fly Demo-1 mission as part of the Commercial Crew Program. Initial plans had hoped to see flights as early as 2015. Demo-1 was eventually slated for no earlier than December 2016, and then delayed several times throughout 2017. The first exact date was published by NASA in November 2018 to be 17 January 2019, but this got pushed into February 2019. The static fire took place on 24 January 2019 and the launch date was set to 23 February 2019. By the end of January 2019, the launch was delayed to no earlier than 2 March 2019 according to a FCC filing by SpaceX for Dragon 2 capsule telemetry, tracking, and command.

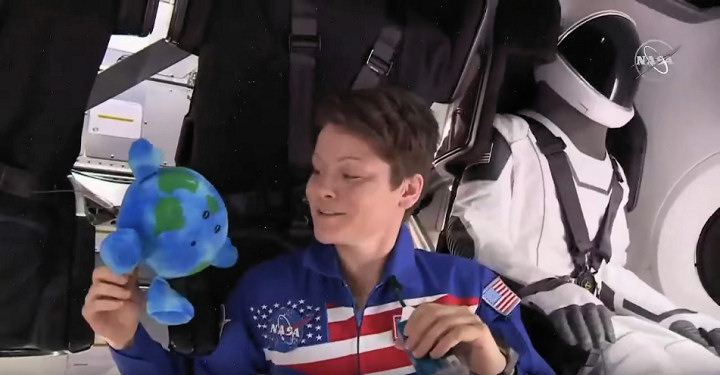
Expedition 58 crew member Anne McClain poses with "Little Earth" inside C204; the capsule was docked to the ISS for five days.

Crew Dragon C204 was successfully launched uncrewed on top of a Falcon 9 rocket on 2 March 2019 from the historic LC 39A from the Kennedy Space Center in Cape Canaveral, Florida. The flight was intended to certify the Crew Dragon to carry humans, demonstrating on-orbit operation of avionics, communications, telemetry, life support, electrical, and propulsion systems, as well as the guidance, navigation, control (GNC) systems. It docked to the International Space Station the next day on 3 March 2019. It spent a total of five days docked to the ISS before it undocked from the ISS on 8 March 2019. The spacecraft performed entry into the Earth's atmosphere and splashed down in the Atlantic Ocean about 200 miles (320 km) off Florida's east coast. The capsule was recovered using SpaceX's recovery ship, GO Searcher, and was returned to shore, where it was examined and the data collected by the on board sensors was analyzed. Instead of carrying astronauts to the ISS, the spacecraft carried "Ripley," a mannequin wearing SpaceX's custom flight suit. Ripley is a named after Sigourney Weaver's character in the Alien movies franchise. The capsule was weighted similarly to missions with astronauts onboard and carried approximately 400 lb (180 kg) of supplies and equipment, including "Little Earth," a plush toy serving as zero-g indicator.

On 20 April 2019, Crew Dragon C204 was destroyed in an explosion during static fire testing at the Landing Zone 1 facility. On the day of the explosion, the initial testing of the Crew Dragon's Draco thrusters was successful, with the accident occurring during the test of the SuperDraco abort system. Telemetry, high-speed camera footage, and analysis of recovered debris indicate the problem occurred when a small amount of dinitrogen tetroxide leaked into a helium line used to pressurize the propellant tanks. The leakage apparently occurred during pre-test processing. As a result, the pressurization of the system 100 ms before firing damaged a check valve and resulted in the explosion. Since the destroyed capsule had been slated for use in the upcoming in-flight abort test, the explosion and investigation delayed that test and the subsequent crewed orbital test.

== Flights ==
Mission	Patch	Launch date (UTC)	Crew	Duration	Remarks	Outcome
SpX-DM1		2 March 2019, 07:49:03	—N/a	4d 20h 41m	First uncrewed flight test of Dragon 2 capsule: spent five days docked to ISS before undocking and landing on 8 March 2019.	Success

== See also ==
- Crew Dragon Demo-1
