= Megan (ship) =

SpaceX Dragon Recovery Vessel

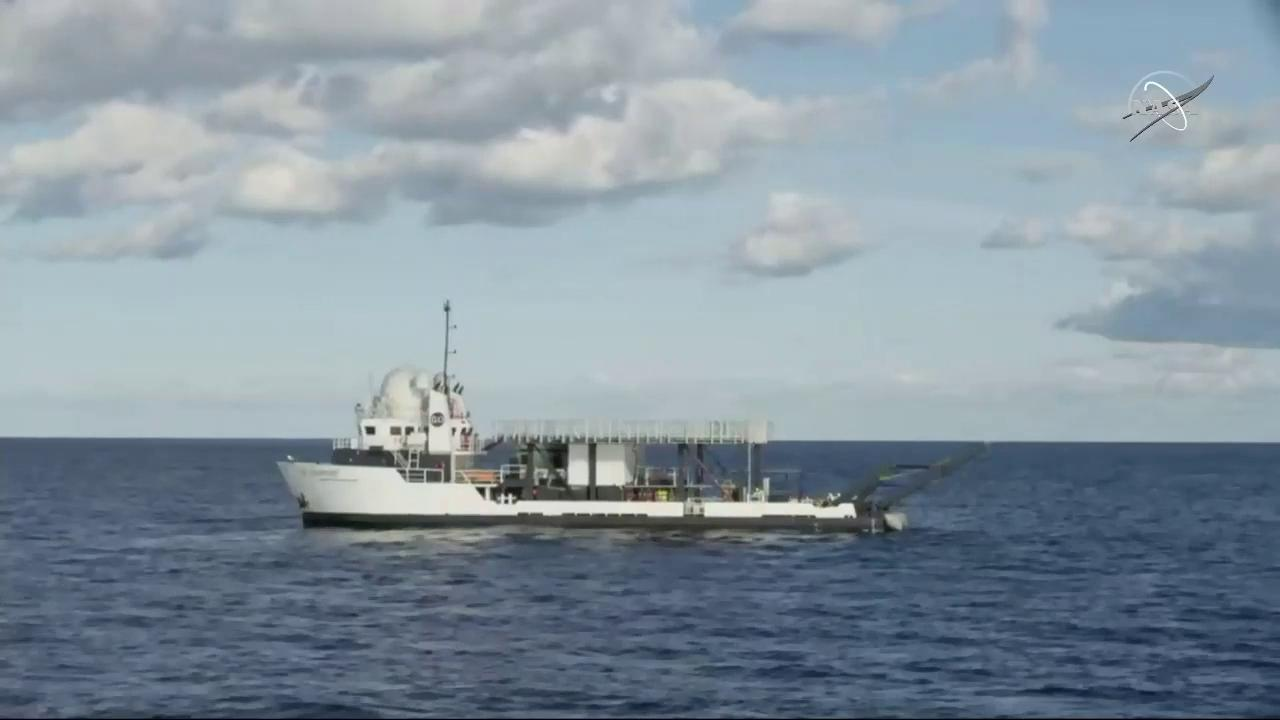
- Megan, one of SpaceX’s two recovery ships, is pictured in the Atlantic Ocean off the Florida coast while awaiting the splashdown of the company’s Crew Dragon spacecraft.

History

United States
- Name: Megan (2022–2025); GO Searcher (2014–2022); Harvey Otter (2013); Callais Searcher (2010–2013)
- Namesake: Megan McArthur
- Owner: Falcon Landing LLC (2022–2025); Guice Offshore (2014–2022); Harvey Gulf International Marine (2013); Abdon Callais Offshore (2010–2013)
- Operator: SpaceX (2016–2025); Guice Offshore (2014–2022); Harvey Gulf International Marine (2013); Abdon Callais Offshore (2010–2013)
- Port of registry: Port Canaveral, Florida
- Builder: Master Boat Builders, Coden, Alabama
- Laid down: 2009
- Launched: 2010
- Christened: 2025
- Completed: 2025
- Maiden voyage: 2010
- In service: September 2010
- Out of service: June 2025
- Identification: Call sign: WDH3015; IMO number: 9591648; MMSI number: 366584000
- Status: Retired

General characteristics
- Class & type: Space capsule recovery vessel; Platform supply vessel
- Tonnage: 497 GT; 576 DWT
- Length: 52 m (170 ft 7 in)
- Beam: 11 m (36 ft 1 in)
- Draught: 3 m (9 ft 10 in)
- Depth: 3.7 m (12 ft)
- Decks: 1
- Installed power: 1,750 hp (1,300 kW)
- Propulsion: 2 × Caterpillar 3508B
- Speed: 22 kn (41 km/h; 25 mph)
- Capacity: 32
- Crew: 6

MV Megan, formerly known as MV GO Searcher, was one of SpaceX's two Dragon capsule recovery vessels; it was retired in 2025. Owned by SpaceX through Falcon Landing LLC (which also owns SpaceX's fairing recovery vessels and Elon Musk's private jet), this ship and its sister vessel, MV Shannon, were converted platform supply vessels equipped to retrieve Crew Dragon and Cargo Dragon capsules after splashdown.

When a Dragon capsule was preparing to return to Earth, Megan or Shannon were dispatched to wait near the predetermined landing zone. After splashdown, fast boats deployed from the vessel, approach the capsule to perform safety checks, check on the crew, and prepare it to be lifted aboard the recovery vessel, where the astronauts can exit the capsule. NASA required SpaceX to allow the astronauts to exit within 60 minutes of splashdown.

To support these operations, the vessel was fitted with a specialized crane on the stern to lift the capsule from the water, a medical facility to treat astronauts, and a helipad for rapid transport of astronauts and time-sensitive returned cargo to shore.

== History ==
Megan was built by Master Boat Builders of Coden, Alabama as an offshore supply vessel, a ship specially designed to supply offshore oil and gas platforms and other offshore installations. The keel laying for the vessel took place in 2009 and was launched in 2010.

The vessel was purchased new by Abdon Callais Offshore and named MV CALLAIS Searcher. As Abdon Callais Offshore's parent company exited the marine transportation business, it sold the vessel to Harvey Gulf International Marine, which renamed it MV HARVEY Otter. The vessel was sold to Guice Offshore (GO) in 2014, which renamed it MV GO Searcher.

SpaceX had previously retrieved its cargo-only Dragon 1 capsules with a similar offshore supply vessel but needed additional capabilities as it prepared for crewed and cargo launches with the Dragon 2. It contracted with Guice Offshore to modify two offshore supply vessels with a capsule lifting frame (a specialized crane), a medical treatment unit, a helipad, and extensive technology upgrades.

GO Searcher was first used on March 8, 2019, to recover the Dragon used for the uncrewed Demo-1 mission. The vessel was also used for an August 2019 rehearsal of Crew Dragon crew extraction with the astronauts that would fly on the Demo-2 mission. However, its sister vessel, MV GO Navigator (later renamed Shannon) was used to retrieve the astronauts after the Demo-2 flight.

Between April 2019 and June 2021, GO Searcher was used in support of nine missions of the SpaceX fairing recovery program. The vessel can accommodate a single Falcon 9 fairing half in the Dragon egress area. On January 19, 2020, the vessel was used to recover the Crew Dragon capsule after the In-Flight Abort Test.

GO Searcher first recovered a crew from a Dragon capsule on September 18, 2021, when it retrieved Crew Dragon Resilience after its Inspiration4 mission, the first orbital spaceflight with only private citizens aboard. Since that time, it has only been used for recovering Crew Dragon or Cargo Dragon capsules.

In early 2022, GO Searcher was renamed Megan in honor of Megan McArthur, the second female NASA astronaut to fly on a SpaceX Dragon capsule.

In July 2024, SpaceX announced plans to shift Dragon recovery operations from the U.S. East Coast (Atlantic Ocean and Gulf of Mexico) to the U.S. West Coast and the Pacific Ocean beginning in 2025, citing concerns about Dragon trunk debris potentially landing over populated areas. As part of this change, the company repositioned its other Dragon recovery vessel, MV Shannon, to the Pacific Ocean at the end of 2024 to support West Coast splashdown operations.

Megan continued to operate in the Atlantic Ocean and Gulf of Mexico until March 2025. Its final recovery mission was the splashdown of Crew-9 in the Gulf of Mexico on March 9, 2025. Following this final East Coast splashdown, the vessel became operationally redundant, as SpaceX no longer required two recovery ships on the West Coast due to the proximity of planned splashdown sites.

Megan departed Port Canaveral for the final time on June 18, 2025. SpaceX officially confirmed the vessel’s retirement on June 27, 2025. According to administrative paperwork, the ship is currently laid up in Louisiana.

== List of recovery missions ==
Date	Mission	Role
March 8, 2019	Demo-1	Crew Dragon recovery
April 11, 2019	ArabSat-6A	Fairing recovery support
May 24, 2019	Starlink	Fairing recovery support
June 25, 2019	STP-2	Fairing recovery support
August 6, 2019	Amos-17	Fairing recovery support
November 11, 2019	Starlink-2	Fairing recovery support
January 19, 2020	In-Flight Abort Test	Crew Dragon recovery
March 11, 2021	Starlink 20	Fairing recovery support
March 14, 2021	Starlink 21	Fairing recovery support
May 26, 2021	Starlink 28	Fairing recovery support
June 6, 2021	SXM-8	Fairing recovery support
September 18, 2021	Inspiration4	Crew Dragon recovery
October 1, 2021	CRS-23	Cargo Dragon recovery
January 24, 2022	CRS-24	Cargo Dragon recovery
April 25, 2022	Axiom-1	Crew Dragon recovery
August 20, 2022	CRS-25	Cargo Dragon recovery
October 14, 2022	Crew-4	Crew Dragon recovery
January 11, 2023	CRS-26	Cargo Dragon recovery
May 31, 2023	Axiom-2	Crew Dragon recovery
September 4, 2023	Crew-6	Crew Dragon recovery
March 12, 2024	Crew-7	Crew Dragon recovery
October 25, 2024	Crew-8	Crew Dragon recovery
December 17, 2024	CRS-31	Cargo Dragon recovery
March 18, 2025	Crew-9	Crew Dragon recovery

== Incidents ==
- According to United States Coast Guard, on May 9, 2020, while practicing recovering the SpaceX Dragon 2 capsule, GO Searcher's crew pulled a man from the Atlantic Ocean.

== Gallery ==
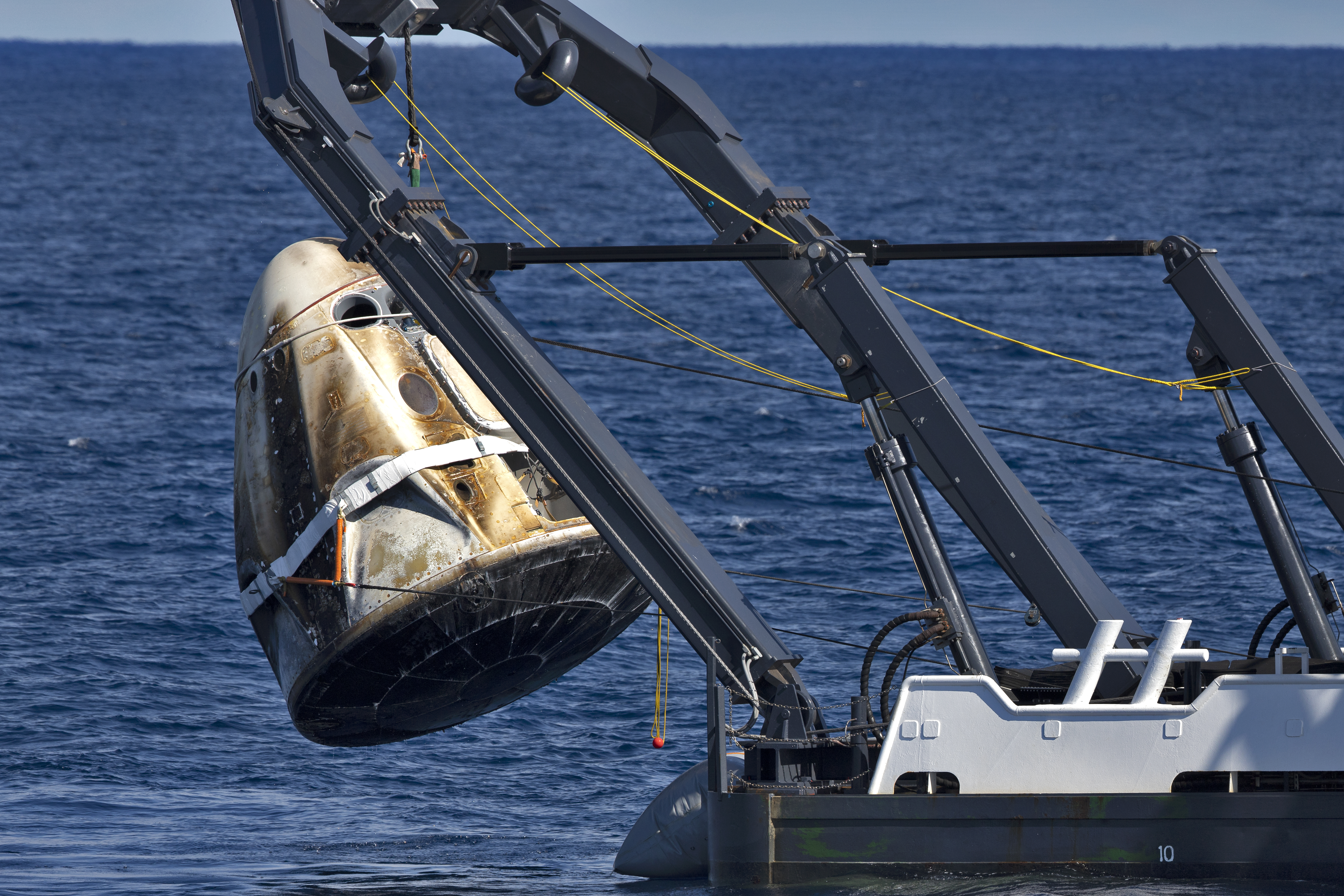
Crew Dragon being lifted from the water and onto the vessel after the Demo-1 mission, March 8, 2019

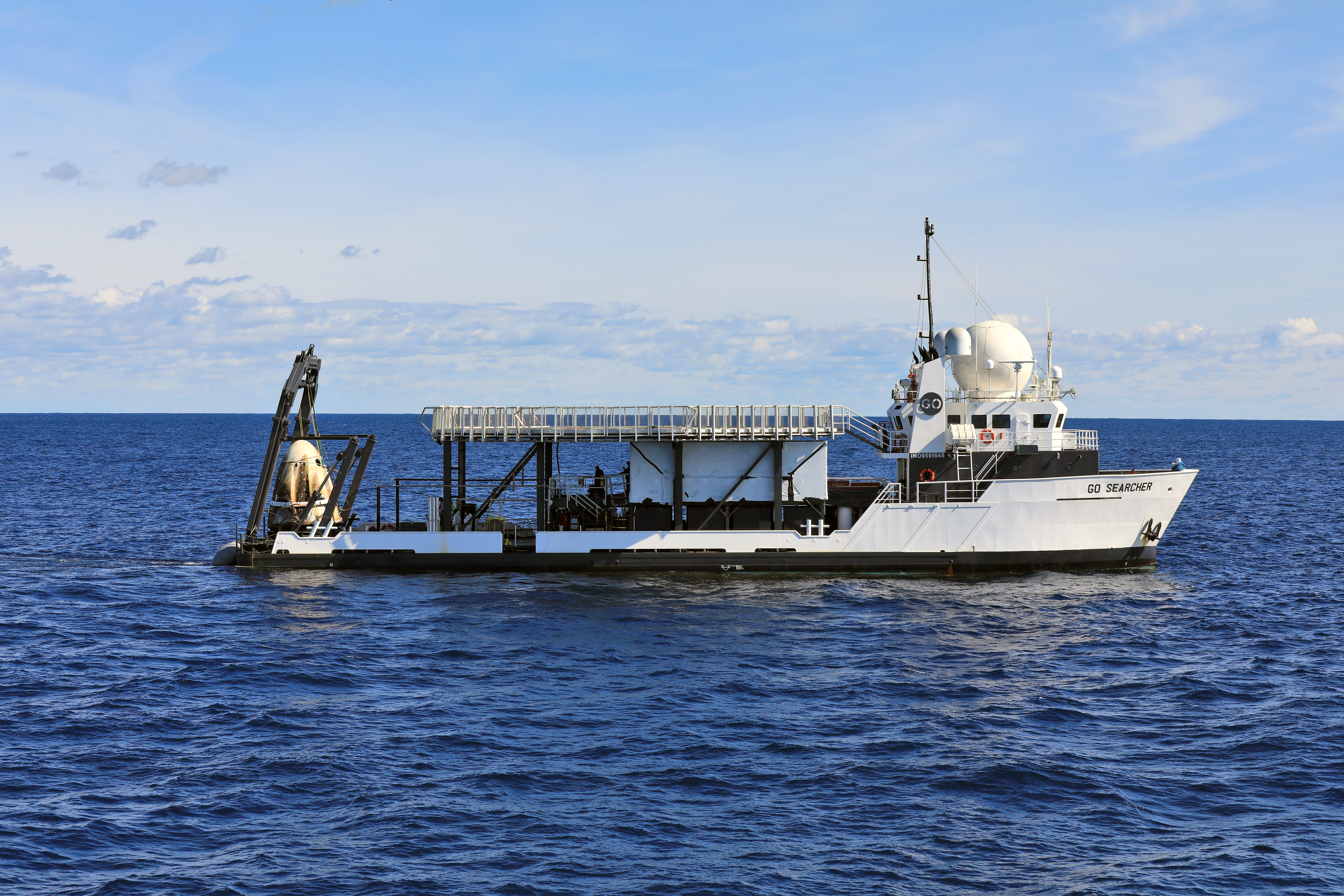
Crew Dragon sits on the vessel, about 200 miles off Florida’s east coast, after the Demo-1 mission, March 8, 2019

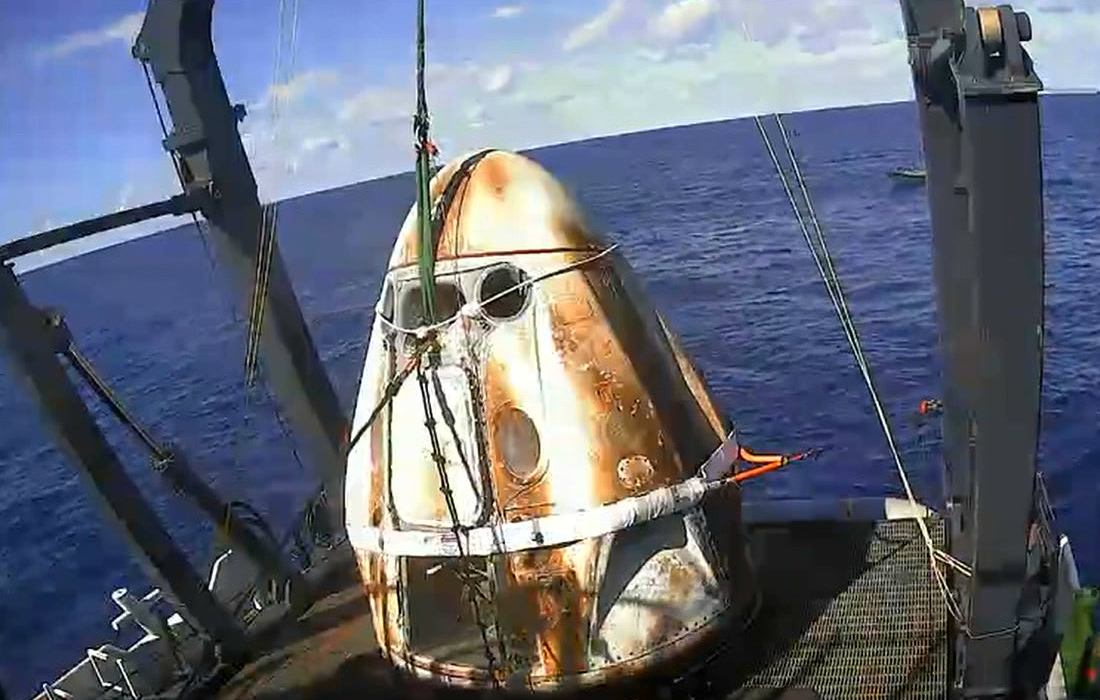
Crew Dragon sits on the vessel, after the Demo-1 mission, March 8, 2019

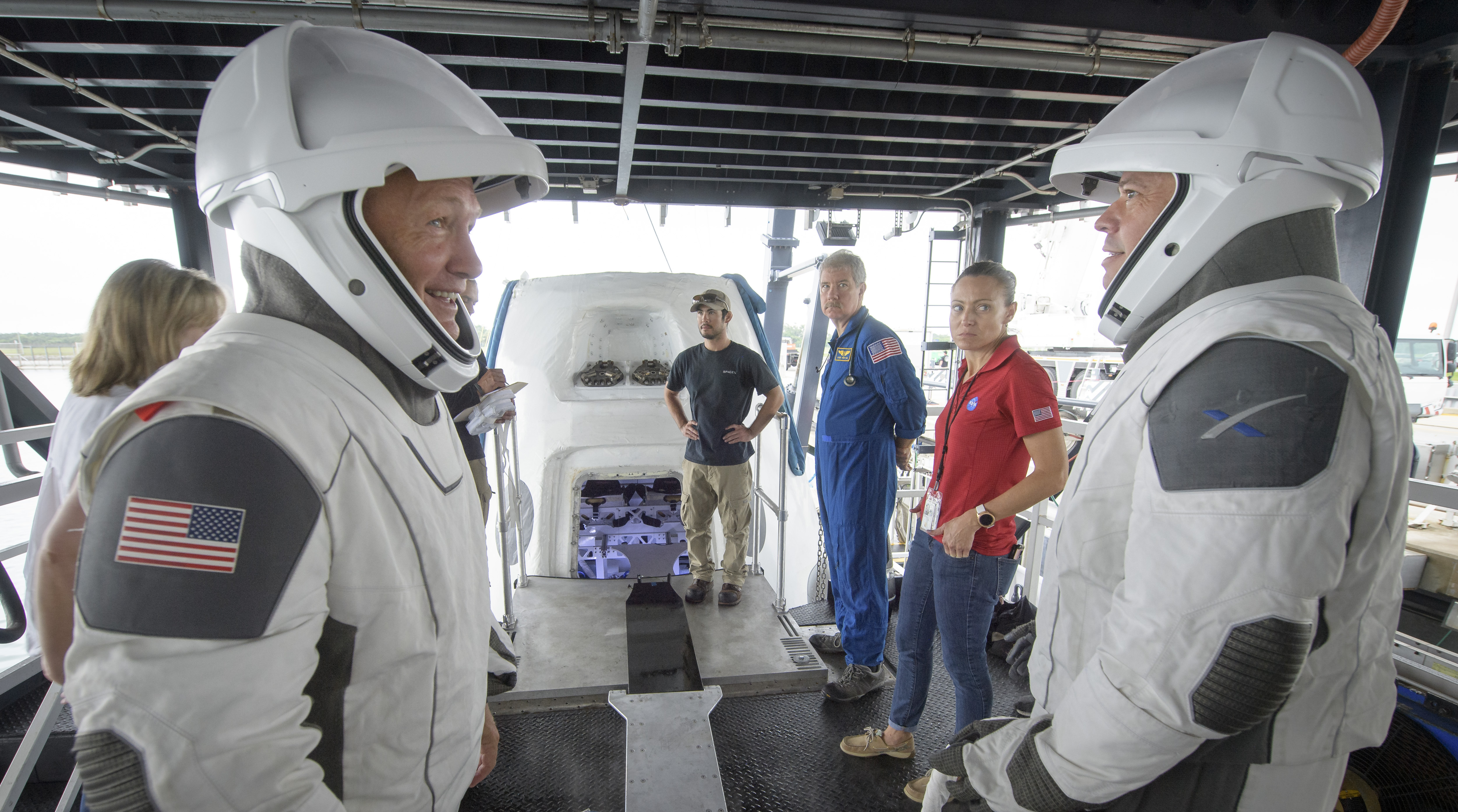
NASA astronauts Doug Hurley (left) and Bob Behnken (right) on the vessel, rehearsing Crew Dragon crew extraction with teams from NASA and SpaceX, August 13, 2019. The ship would later be named after the wife of Behnken, Megan McArthur, who would fly on the SpaceX Crew-2 mission.

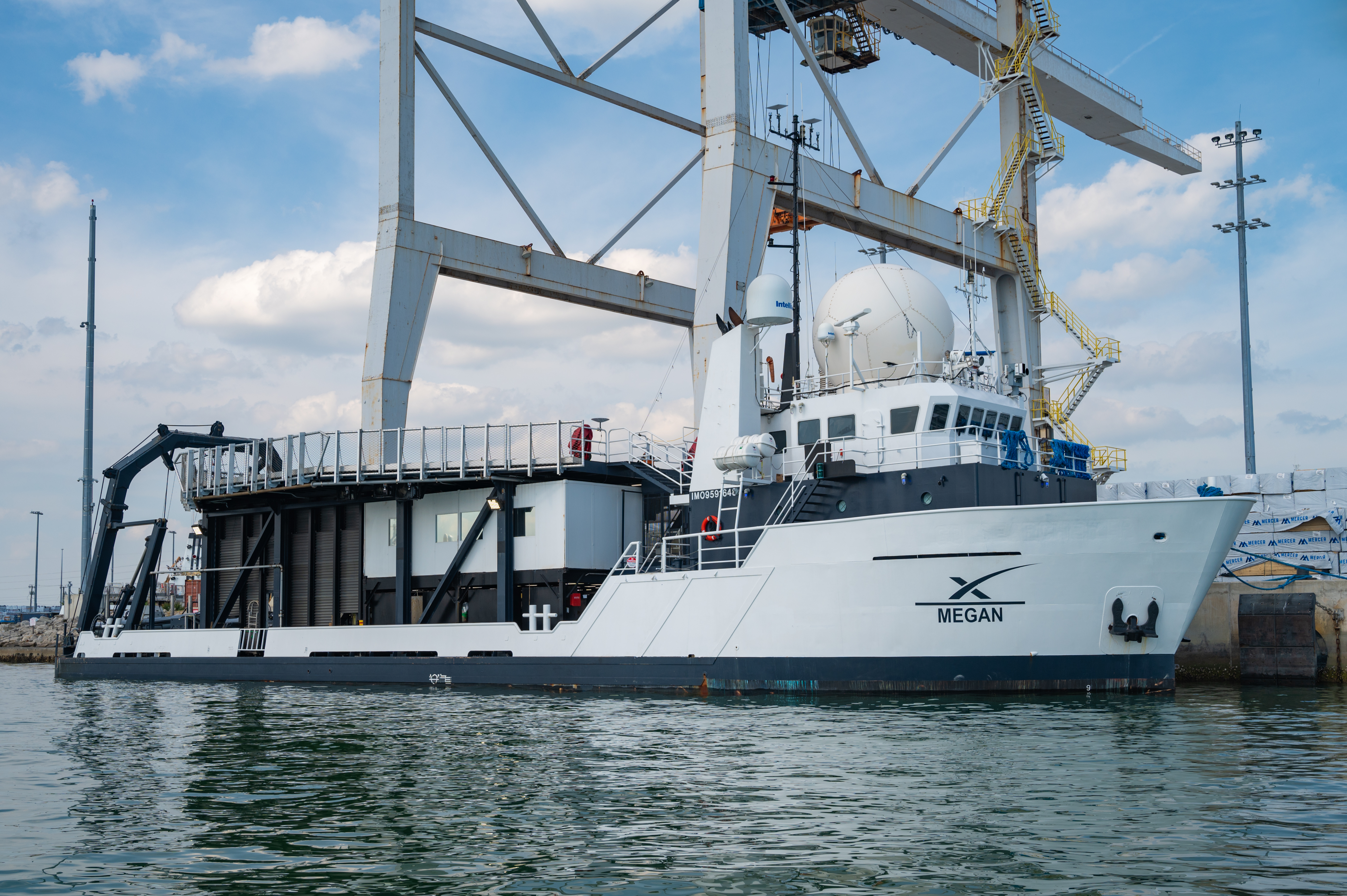
The vessel, now named Megan, at its home port at the West Basin in Port Canaveral, Florida on February 25, 2023.
