= SuperDraco =

Family of rocket engines developed by SpaceX for use on its Crewed Dragon spacecraft

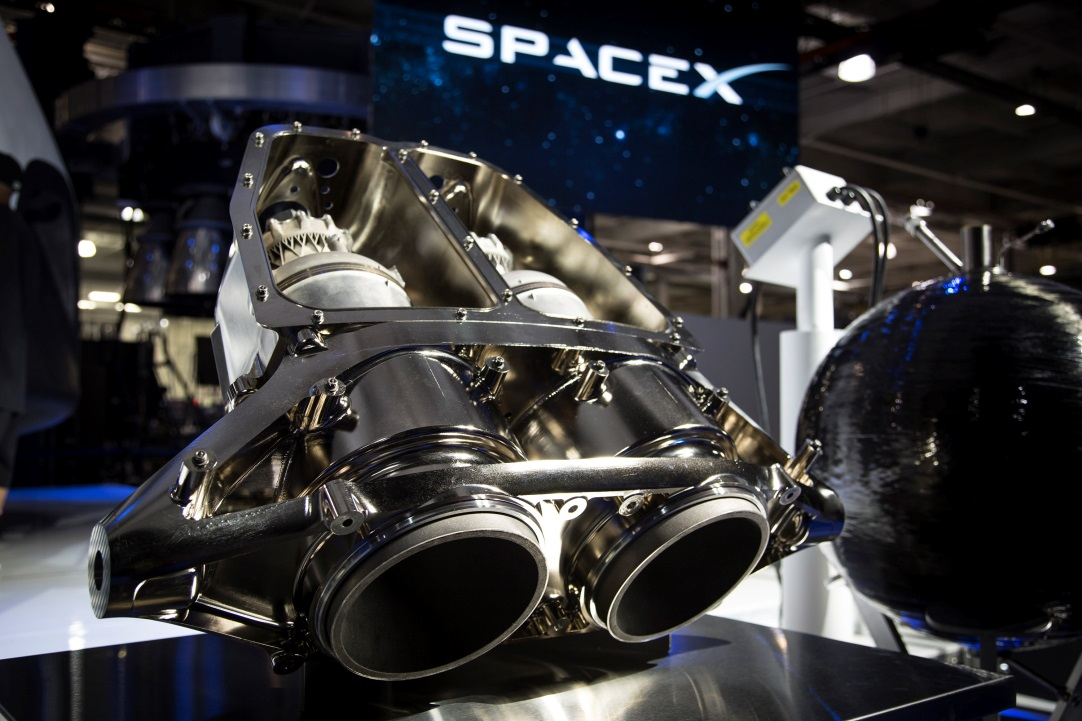
- A pair of SuperDraco rocket engines at SpaceX Hawthorne facility
- Country of origin: United States
- Manufacturer: SpaceX
- Application: Launch escape system, propulsive landing
- Status: Operational

Liquid-fuel engine
- Propellant: N_{2}O_{4} / CH_{6}N_{2}

Performance
- Thrust, sea-level: 71 kN (16,000 lbf), individually 32,000 lbf, dual-engine cluster
- Chamber pressure: 6.9 MPa (1,000 psi)
- Specific impulse, sea-level: 235 s (2.30 km/s)
- Burn time: 25 sec
- Propellant capacity: 1,388 kg (3,060 lb)

Used in
- SpaceX Dragon 2

SuperDraco is a hypergolic propellant rocket engine designed and built by SpaceX. It is part of the SpaceX Draco family of rocket engines. A redundant array of eight SuperDraco engines provides fault-tolerant propulsion for use as a launch escape system for the SpaceX Dragon 2, a passenger-carrying space capsule.

SuperDraco rocket engines utilize a storable (non-cryogenic) hypergolic propellant which allows the engines to be fired many months after fueling and launch. They combine the functions of both a reaction control system and a main propulsive engine. Hypergolic fuels do not require an external source of ignition, providing increased reliability for the spacecraft.

The engines are used on crew transport flights to low Earth orbit, and were also projected to be used for entry, descent and landing control of the now-canceled Red Dragon to Mars.

SuperDracos are used on the SpaceX Dragon 2 crew-transporting space capsule and were used on the DragonFly, a prototype low-altitude reusable rocket that was used for flight testing various aspects of the propulsive-landing technology. While the engine is capable of 73,000 newtons (16,400 lbf) of thrust, during use for DragonFly testing, the engines were throttled to 68,170 newtons (15,325 lbf) to maintain vehicle stability.

SpaceX originally intended to use the SuperDraco engines to land Crew Dragon on land; parachutes and an ocean splashdown were envisioned for use only in the case of an aborted launch. Precision water landing under parachutes was proposed to NASA as "the baseline return and recovery approach for the first few flights" of Crew Dragon. The plan to use propulsive landing was later cancelled, leaving ocean splashdown under parachutes as the only option. In 2024, the use of the SuperDraco thrusters for propulsive landing was enabled again, but only as a back-up for parachute emergencies.

== History ==
On February 1, 2012 SpaceX announced that it had completed the development of a new, more powerful version of a storable-propellant rocket engine, this one called SuperDraco. This high-thrust hypergolic engine—about 200 times more powerful than the Draco RCS thruster hypergolic engine—offers deep throttling ability, and just like the Draco thruster, was designed to provide multiple restart capability and use the same shared hypergolic propellants as Draco. Its primary purpose was to be for SpaceX's launch abort system (LAS) on the Dragon spacecraft. According to a NASA press release, the engine has a transient from ignition to full thrust of 100 ms. During launch abort, eight SuperDracos were expected to fire for 5 seconds at full thrust. The development of the engine was partially funded by NASA's CCDev 2 program.

Name: Draco comes from the Greek drakōn for dragon. Draco (constellation) is a constellation (the Dragon) in the polar region of the Northern Hemisphere near Cepheus and Ursa Major.

== Design ==
SuperDraco engines use a storable propellant mixture of monomethylhydrazine fuel and dinitrogen tetroxide oxidizer. They are capable of being restarted many times, and have the capability to deeply reduce their thrust providing precise control during propulsive landing of the Dragon capsule.

SuperDraco is the third most powerful engine developed by SpaceX. It is approximately 200 times as powerful as the Draco thruster engine. By comparison, it is more than twice as powerful as the Kestrel engine that was used in SpaceX's Falcon 1 launch vehicle second stage, about 1/9 the thrust of a Merlin 1D engine, and expected to be 1/26th as powerful as the SpaceX Raptor engine.

In addition to the use of the SuperDraco thrusters for powered-landings on Earth, NASA's Ames Research Center was studying the feasibility of a Dragon-derived Mars lander for scientific investigation until 2017. Preliminary analysis in 2011 indicated that the final deceleration would be within the retro-propulsion SuperDraco thruster capabilities.

SuperDraco is designed to be highly throttleable, from 100 to 20% of full thrust. This would have been used for precision controllable propulsive landings of the Dragon V2 spacecraft.

== Engine testing ==
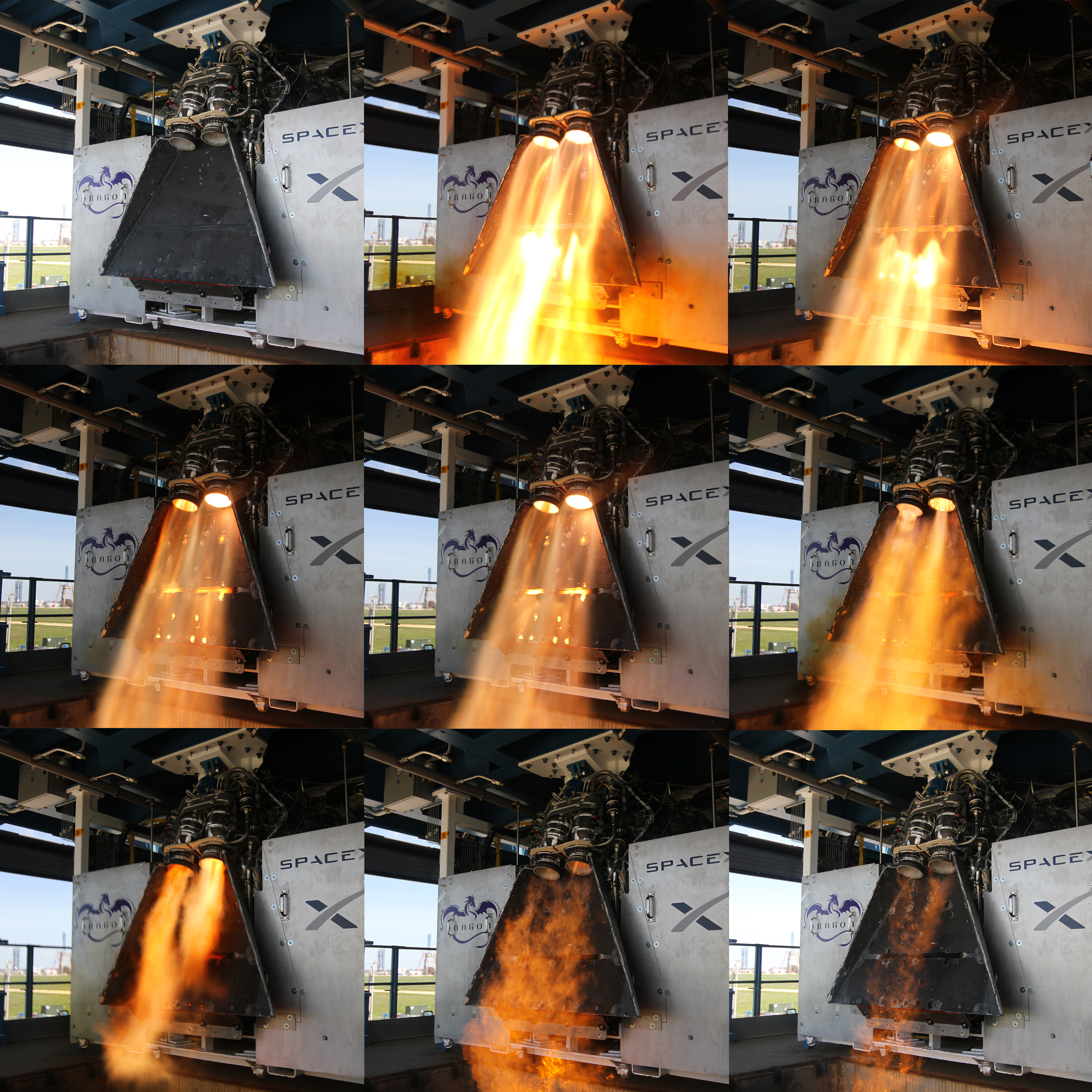
SuperDraco test-fire mosaic

The SuperDraco engine development program had an extensive test program that spanned several years. As of December 2012, the SuperDraco ground-test engines had been fired a total of 58 times for a total firing-time duration of 117 seconds and SpaceX expressed hope that the test results would exceed the original requirements for the engine.

A second version of the engine was developed in 2013, this one manufactured with 3D printing rather than the traditional casting technique. By July 2014, the 3D-printed engine combustion chamber had been fired over 80 times, for a total duration of more than 300 seconds, and it likewise completed a full qualification test.

The SuperDraco completed qualification testing in May 2014 – including testing "across a variety of conditions including multiple starts, extended firing durations and extreme off-nominal propellant flow and temperatures."

By January 2015, SpaceX demonstrated the SuperDraco engine pod with full functionality at McGregor, Texas. Four of these engine pods, each containing two SuperDraco engines, will be used in the Dragon 2 crewed spacecraft.

In April 2015, SpaceX and NASA set a timeframe to test a Dragon 2's SuperDraco engines with a pad abort test. The test eventually occurred on May 6, 2015, from a test stand at Cape Canaveral Air Force Station SLC-40. and was successful.

On April 20, 2019, the SpaceX Crew Dragon capsule used on DM-1 was destroyed during a test of the SuperDraco engines at Landing Zone 1.

== Manufacturing ==
On September 5, 2013 Elon Musk tweeted an image of a regeneratively cooled SuperDraco rocket chamber emerging from an EOS 3D metal printer, and indicated that it was composed of the Inconel superalloy. This was later shown to be the production technique for the flight-level engines.

It was announced in May 2014 that the flight-qualified version of the SuperDraco engine is the first fully 3D printed rocket engine. In particular, the engine combustion chamber is printed of Inconel, an alloy of nickel and iron, using a process of direct metal laser sintering, and operates at a chamber pressure 6,900 kilopascals (1,000 psi) at a very high temperature. The engines are contained in a printed protective nacelle to prevent fault propagation in the event of an engine failure.

The ability to 3D print the complex parts was key to achieving the low-mass objective of the engine. According to Elon Musk, "It’s a very complex engine, and it was very difficult to form all the cooling channels, the injector head, and the throttling mechanism. Being able to print very high strength advanced alloys ... was crucial to being able to create the SuperDraco engine as it is."

The 3D printing process for the SuperDraco engine dramatically reduces lead-time compared to the traditional cast parts, and "has superior strength, ductility, and fracture resistance, with a lower variability in materials properties."

According to Elon Musk, cost reduction through 3D printing is also significant, in particular because SpaceX can print an hourglass chamber where the entire wall consists of internal cooling channels, which would be impossible without additive manufacturing.

== See also ==
- SpaceX Merlin
