= SpaceX CRS-28 =

2023 American resupply spaceflight to the ISS

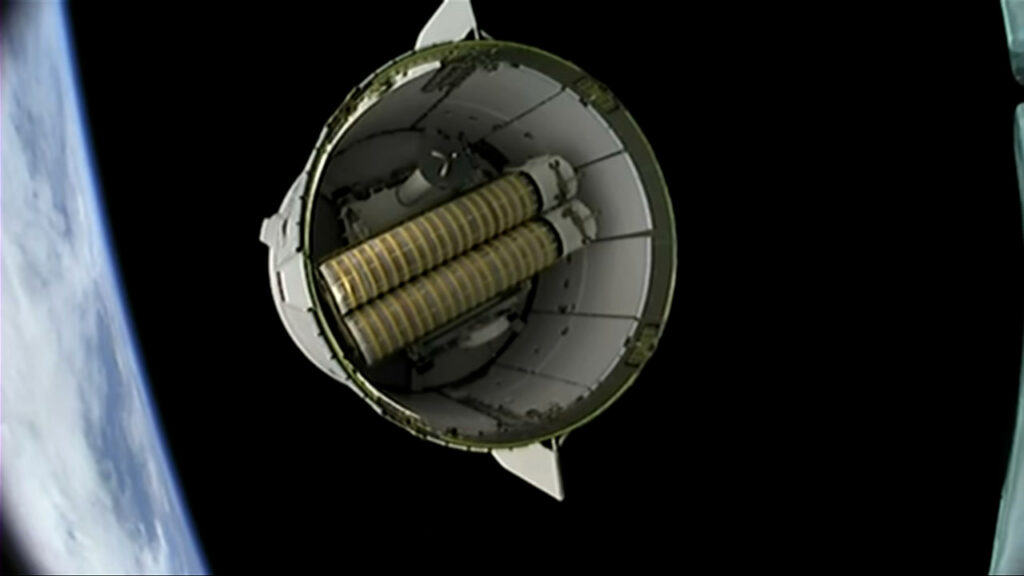
- CRS-28 detached from upper stage showing the iROSA solar arrays stowed in the trunk
- Names: SpX-28
- Mission type: ISS resupply
- Operator: SpaceX
- COSPAR ID: 2023-080A
- SATCAT no.: 56845
- Mission duration: 24 days, 22 hours, 43 minutes

Spacecraft properties
- Spacecraft: Cargo Dragon C208
- Spacecraft type: Cargo Dragon
- Manufacturer: SpaceX
- Dry mass: 9,525 kg (20,999 lb)
- Dimensions: Height: 8.1 m (27 ft); Diameter: 4 m (13 ft)

Start of mission
- Launch date: 5 June 2023, 15:47 UTC
- Rocket: Falcon 9 Block 5 B1077-5
- Launch site: Kennedy Space Center, LC-39A

End of mission
- Recovered by: MV Shannon
- Landing date: 30 June 2023, 14:30 UTC
- Landing site: Atlantic Ocean

Orbital parameters
- Reference system: Geocentric orbit
- Regime: Low Earth orbit
- Inclination: 51.66°

Docking with ISS
- Docking port: Harmony zenith
- Docking date: 6 June 2023, 09:54 UTC
- Undocking date: 29 June 2023, 16:30 UTC
- Time docked: 23 days, 6 hours, 36 minutes

Cargo
- Mass: 3,304 kg (7,284 lb)
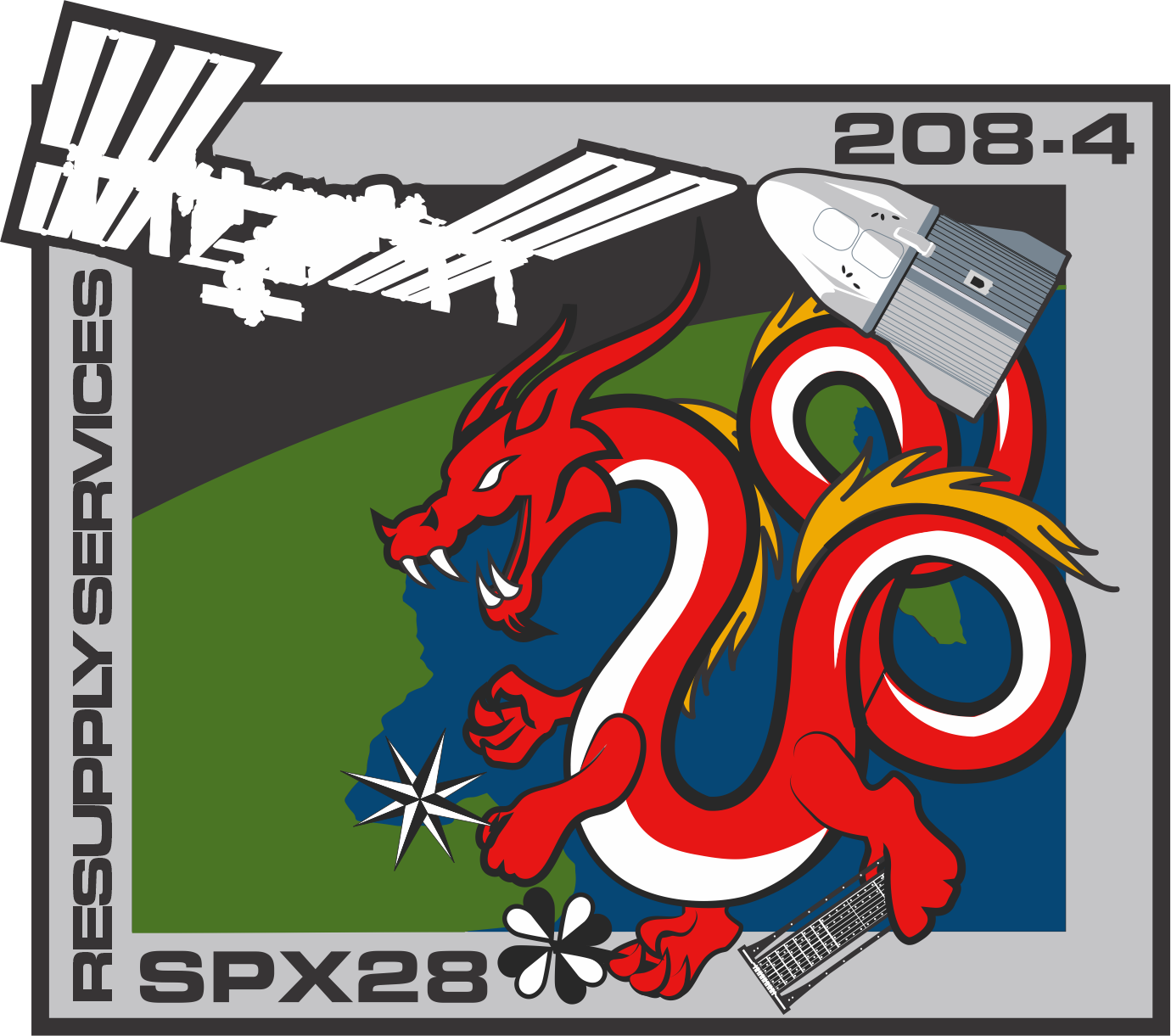
- SpaceX CRS-28 mission patch Commercial Resupply Services Cargo Dragon flights

SpaceX CRS-28, also known as SpX-28, is a Commercial Resupply Service mission to the International Space Station (ISS) launched on 5 June 2023. The mission was contracted by NASA and flown by SpaceX using Cargo Dragon ship C208. It was the eighth flight for SpaceX under NASA's CRS Phase 2.

== Payload ==
=== ISS logistics ===
NASA contracted for the CRS-28 mission from SpaceX and therefore determines the primary payload, date of launch, and orbital parameters for the Cargo Dragon.

- Science investigations: 266 kg (586 lb)
- Vehicle hardware: 491 kg (1,082 lb)
- Crew supplies: 1,098 kg (2,421 lb)
- Spacewalk equipment: 48 kg (106 lb)
- Computer resources: 4 kg (8.8 lb)

=== ISS Roll Out Solar Arrays (iROSA) ===
Third pair of new solar arrays using XTJ Prime space solar cells. They were delivered to the station in the unpressurized trunk of the SpaceX Cargo Dragon spacecraft.

The installation of these new solar arrays will require two spacewalks each: one to prepare the worksite with a modification kit and another to install the new panel.

=== CubeSats ===
CubeSats launched on this mission:

- SC-ODIN – SC-ODIN is a student-led Earth observation mission developed at Concordia University and supported by the Canadian Space Agency (CSA) as part of the Canadian CubeSat Project (CCP) initiative. The mission's primary objective is to help improve our understanding of airborne particles in the atmosphere. This is significant for developing climate-aerosol models that are valuable in the context of advancing climate science. The 3U CubeSat uses a high performing CMOS sensor (GomSpace NanoCam) as its primary payload to take color images of Lake Colhué Huapí in Argentina and the coastal regions of Namibia. Using image processing techniques, researchers can extract aerosol optical depth (AOD) measurements to study the role and impact of dust storms on Earth's climate system. This research is co-led with Université de Montréal. A secondary payload consists of RADFET radiation sensors to monitor the total ionizing dose (TID) that the spacecraft is exposed to. The collected data will improve humanity's understanding of the effects of radiation on various components and hardware by characterizing the radiation environment in low Earth orbit (LEO).
- Moonlighter – This 3U CubeSat was designed by Aerospace Corporation as a cyber test platform and developed in partnership with Space Systems Command (SSC) and the Air Force Research Laboratory (AFRL). Its purpose is to advance space cybersecurity by providing the national security space community with the ability to test and learn in real-time in orbit. Once deployed in summer 2023, Moonlighter’s first mission is to host challenges for the Hack-A-Sat 4 Final Event, which is the first Capture the Flag hacking competition with on-orbit challenges taking place at DEF CON 31 in the Aerospace Village.
- RADSAT-SK – RADSAT-SK is a joint project between the USST, The University of Saskatchewan, Saskatchewan Polytechnic, and the Canadian Space Agency and has three technical objectives. The first of which is the validation and testing of a new type of radiation dosimeter being developed by faculty at the College of Engineering. This new type of sensor is much smaller and cheaper than current space-grade dosimeters. Along with the dosimeter the project scientists will also be testing the use of high-concentration melanin as a radiation shield in space. This research is also being conducted at the U of S by faculty at the college of pharmacology. Lastly, RADSAT-SK will have an earth-imaging camera onboard in the hope that the science team can capture some images of Saskatchewan from space that they can share with the province.
- Ukpik-1
- ESSENCE – The Educational Space Science and ENgineering CubeSat Experiment Mission (Nanoracks-ESSENCE) includes scientific and technical research activities. The scientific tasks focus on Earth observation of arctic ice, permafrost thaw and forest coverage in Northern Canada, and the measurement of solar energetic protons. The payloads are a fisheye camera and a proton detector. They are designed to help fight climate change by improving our understanding of solar proton events to better design and protect spacecraft for a successful mission. The technical task is to examine the effectiveness and robustness of novel attitude navigation and control theory and algorithms using reaction wheels and magnetorquers. Specifically, the task is to demonstrate the attitude control of spacecraft using two reaction wheels with our algorithms by assuming the third one has failed. In case of attitude actuator failure in a fully actuated spacecraft, such control measures provide a means to recover the mission, although with possible degraded performance.

== Mission details ==
The CRS-28 resupply mission was originally planned to launch on 4 June 2023, at 16:12:41 UTC. However, the countdown was stopped at T-01:49:08, and SpaceX scrubbed the mission and postponed it to the day after due to high winds in the recovery area. SpaceX announced, about 45 minutes afterward, the new T-0, planned for 15:47 UTC. The Falcon 9 rocket and the Cargo Dragon spacecraft lifted off at the new T-0, from the Kennedy Space Center's Space Launch Complex-39A. The first stage separation happened at T+02:38 and the Falcon 9 landed at T+09:05 on the A Shortfall of Gravitas droneship. At T+12:11, the Cargo Dragon separated from the second stage.

Dragon docked to the International Space Station's Harmony module on Tuesday, June 6, at 09:54 UTC.

On June 7, SpaceX announced on Twitter that on the previous day, the Dragon 2 fleet as a whole had accumulated 1,324 days in orbit, surpassing the Space Shuttle program's total time in space. SpaceX also said that the mission was the 38th mission to ISS for Dragon 1 and 2 capsules, which exceeded the Shuttle's 37 ISS missions.

Cargo Dragon C208 was undocked from the ISS on 29 June 2023 at 16:30 UTC. The capsule splashed down in the Atlantic Ocean on 30 June 2023 at 14:30 UTC, where it was retrieved by MV Shannon.

== Gallery ==
SpaceX CRS-28
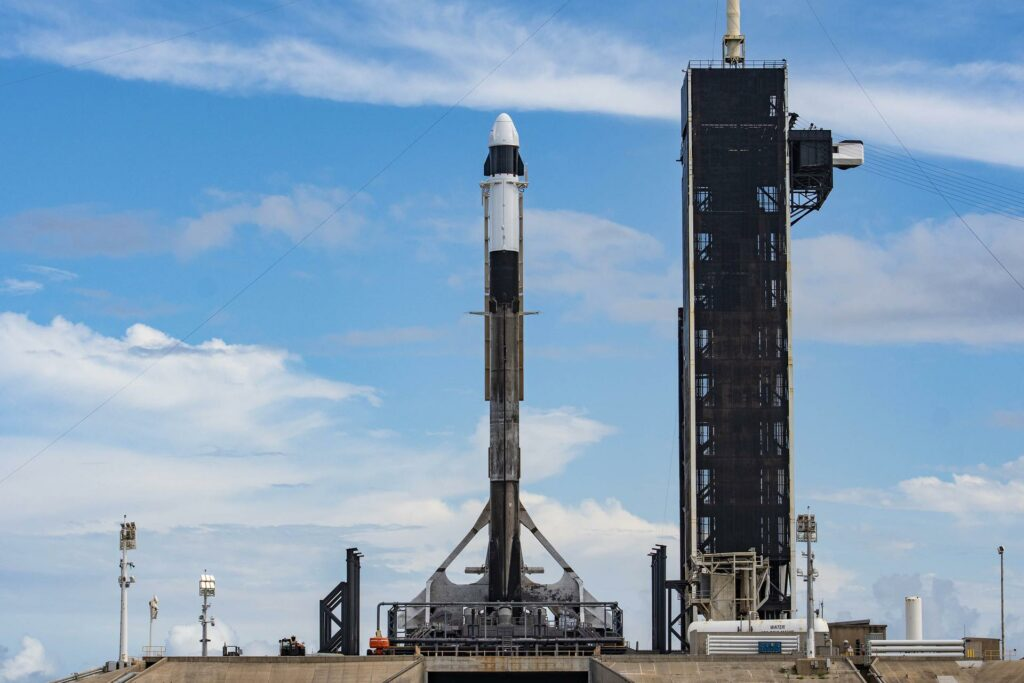
Falcon 9 ahead of launch

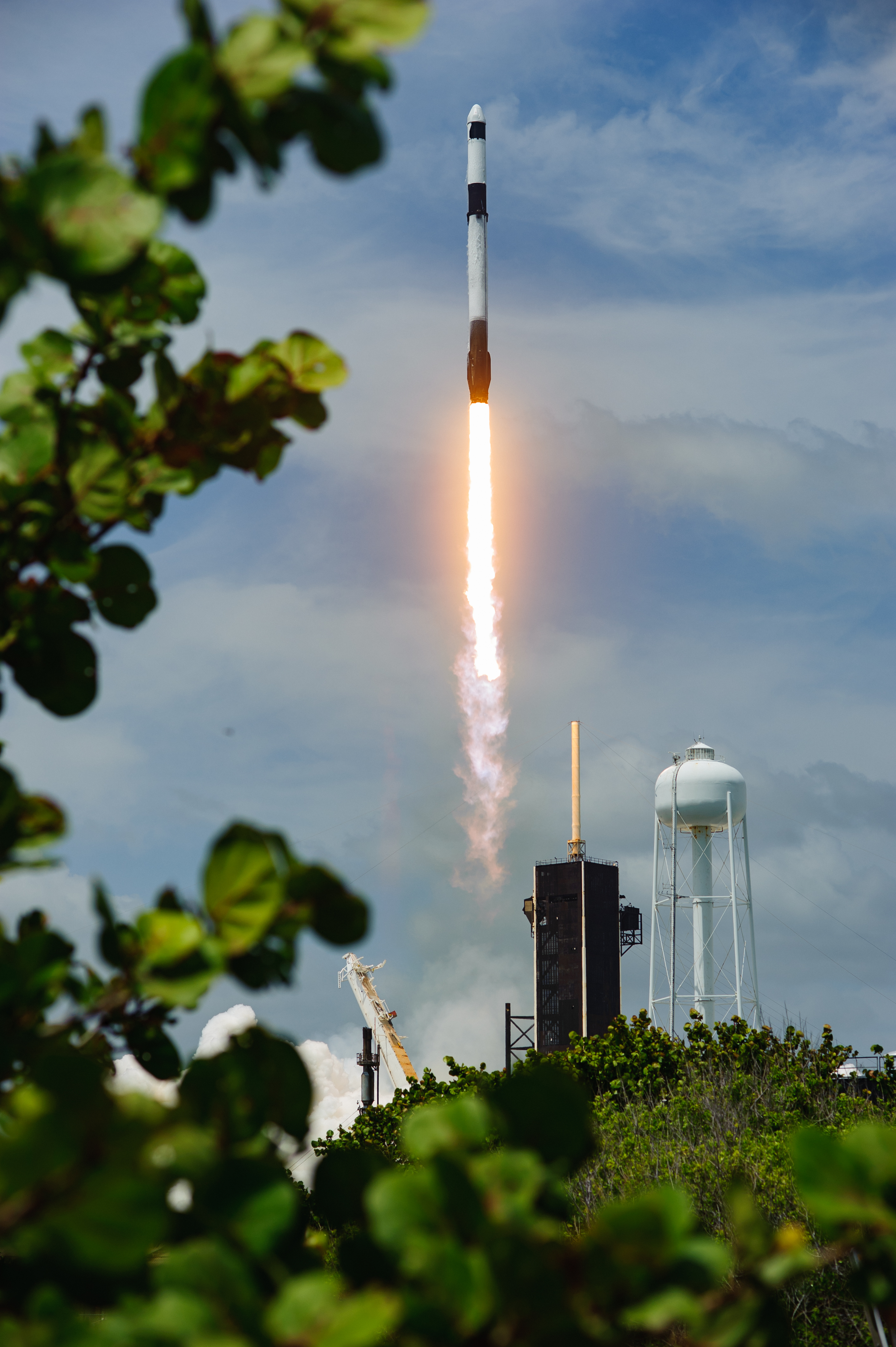
Launch of CRS-28

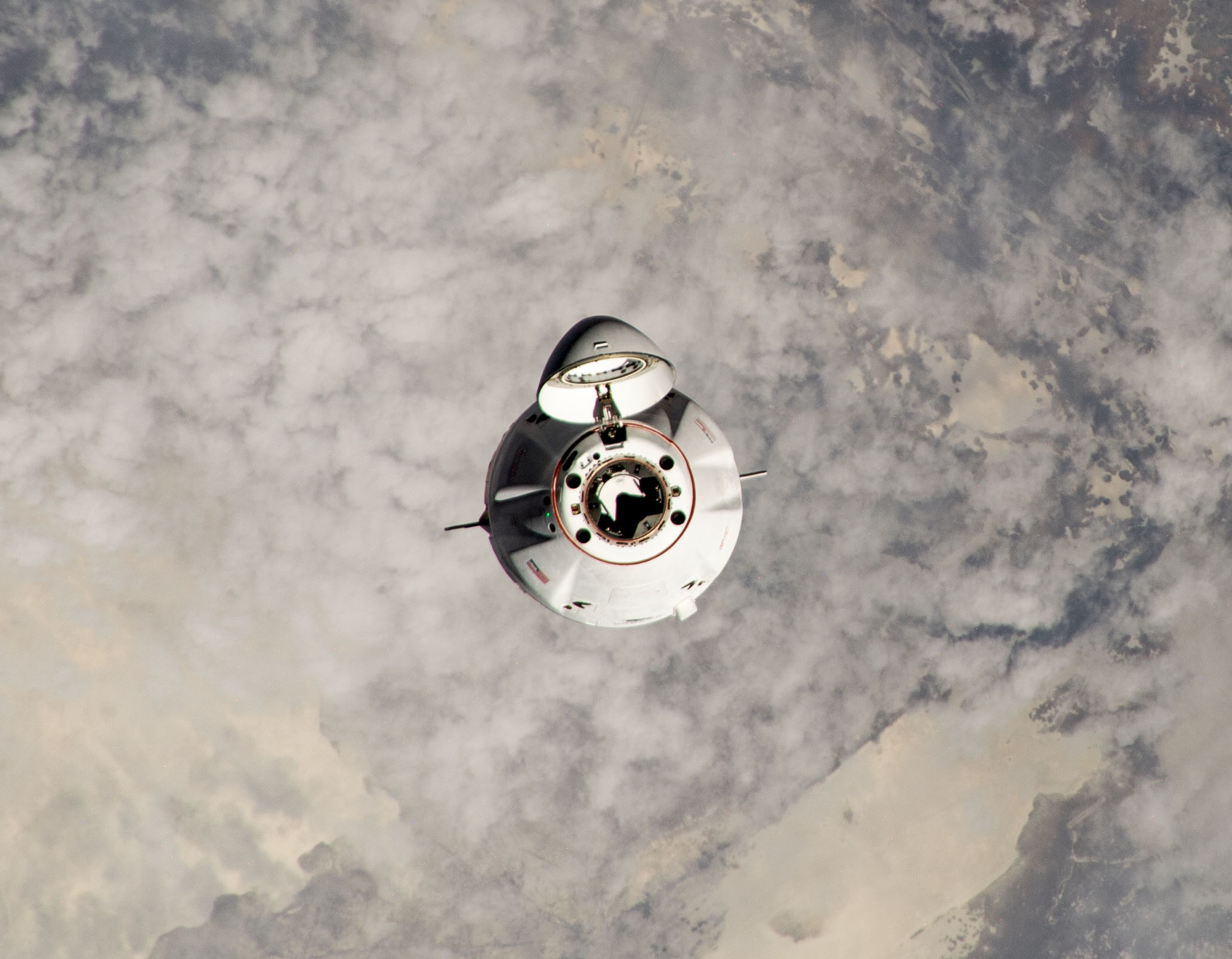
Cargo Dragon approaching the ISS

== See also ==
- Uncrewed spaceflights to the International Space Station
