= SpaceX Dragon 2 =

2020s class of partially reusable spacecraft

Dragon 2
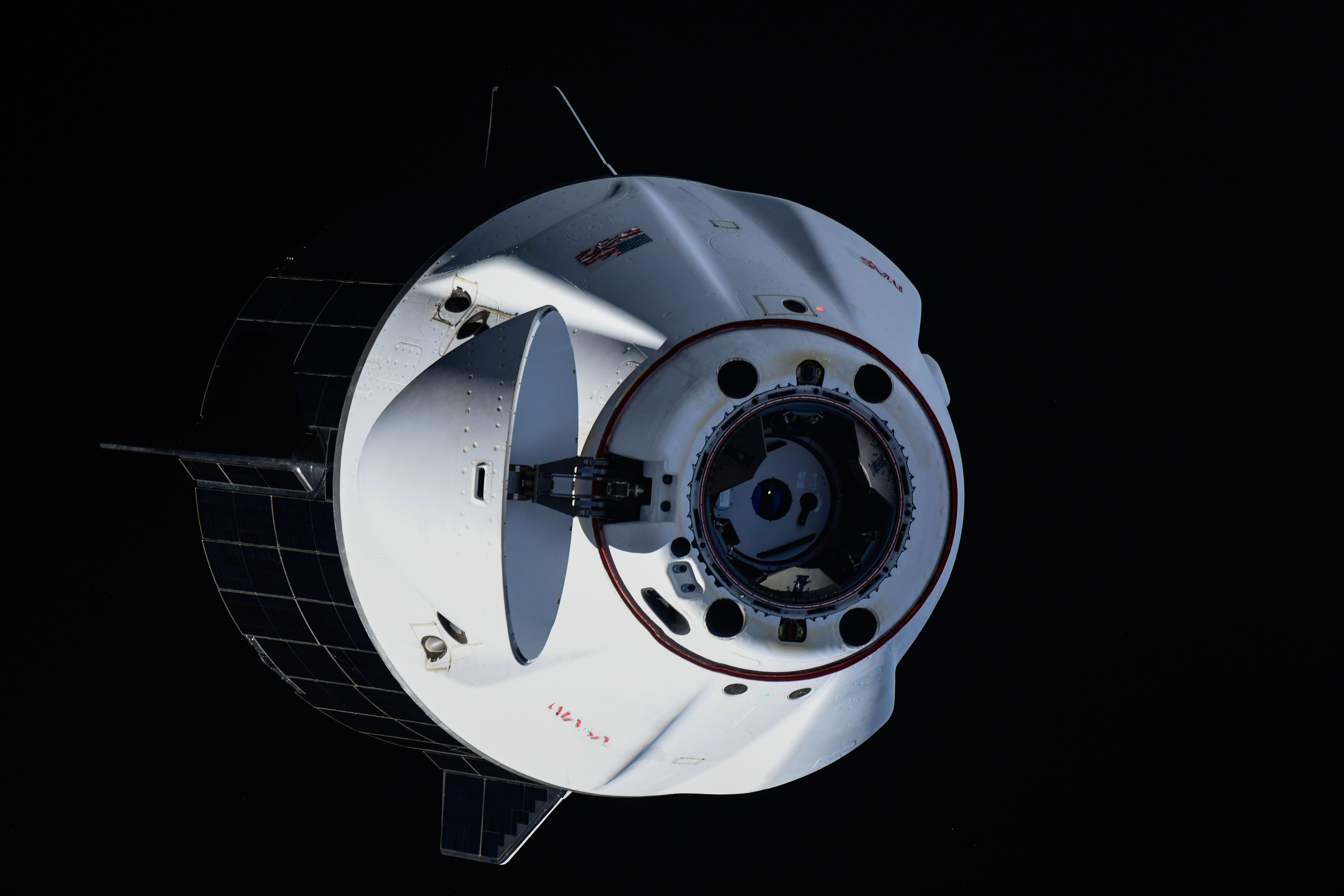
- Crew Dragon Endeavour approaching the ISS in May 2024 during Crew-8
- Manufacturer: SpaceX
- Designer: SpaceX
- Country of origin: United States
- Operator: SpaceX
- Applications: ISS crew and cargo transport; private spaceflight
- Website: spacex.com/vehicles/dragon

Specifications
- Spacecraft type: Capsule
- Launch mass: 12,500 kg (27,600 lb) (Note: The reentry capsule weighs 9,600 kg (21,200 lb) including crew + 150 kg (330 lb) payload (Crew Dragon Demo-2))
- Dry mass: 7,700 kg (16,976 lb)
- Payload capacity: 6,000 kg (13,000 lb) to orbit; 3,307 kg (7,291 lb) to ISS (Note: up to 2,507 kg (5,527 lb) pressurized and up to 800 kg (1,800 lb) unpressurized); 2,507 kg (5,527 lb) return cargo; 800 kg (1,800 lb) disposed cargo
- Crew capacity: 4 (normal operations); 7 (emergency evacuation)
- Volume: Pressurized: 9.3 m^{3} (330 cu ft); Unpressurized: 37 m^{3} (1,300 cu ft)
- Power: 28 V and 120 V DC buses; 1.5-2 kW solar array
- Batteries: 4 × lithium polymer
- Regime: Low Earth orbit
- Design life: 10 days (free flight); 210 days (docked to ISS)

Dimensions
- Height: 4.5 m (15 ft) capsule only; 8.1 m (26.7 ft) capsule with trunk
- Diameter: 4 m (13 ft)
- Width: 3.7 m (12 ft)

Production
- Status: Active
- Built: 13 (7 crew, 3 cargo, 3 prototypes)
- Operational: 9 (5 crew, 3 cargo, 1 prototype)
- Retired: 3 (1 crew, 2 prototypes)
- Lost: 1 (crew, during uncrewed test)
- Maiden launch: Uncrewed test: March 2, 2019; Crewed: May 30, 2020; Cargo: December 6, 2020

Related spacecraft
- Derived from: SpaceX Dragon 1
- Launch vehicle: Falcon 9 Block 5

Thruster details
- Propellant mass: 2,562 kg (5,648 lb)
- Powered by: 16 × Draco (additional 2 x Draco in boost trunk or 30 in Deorbit Vehicle configuration on Cargo Dragon); 8 × SuperDraco as launch escape system on Crew Dragon
- Maximum thrust: Draco: 400 N (90 lb_{f}); SuperDraco: 71 kN (16,000 lb_{f})
- Specific impulse: Draco: 300 s (2.9 km/s)
- Propellant: N_{2}O_{4} / CH_{6}N_{2}

Configuration
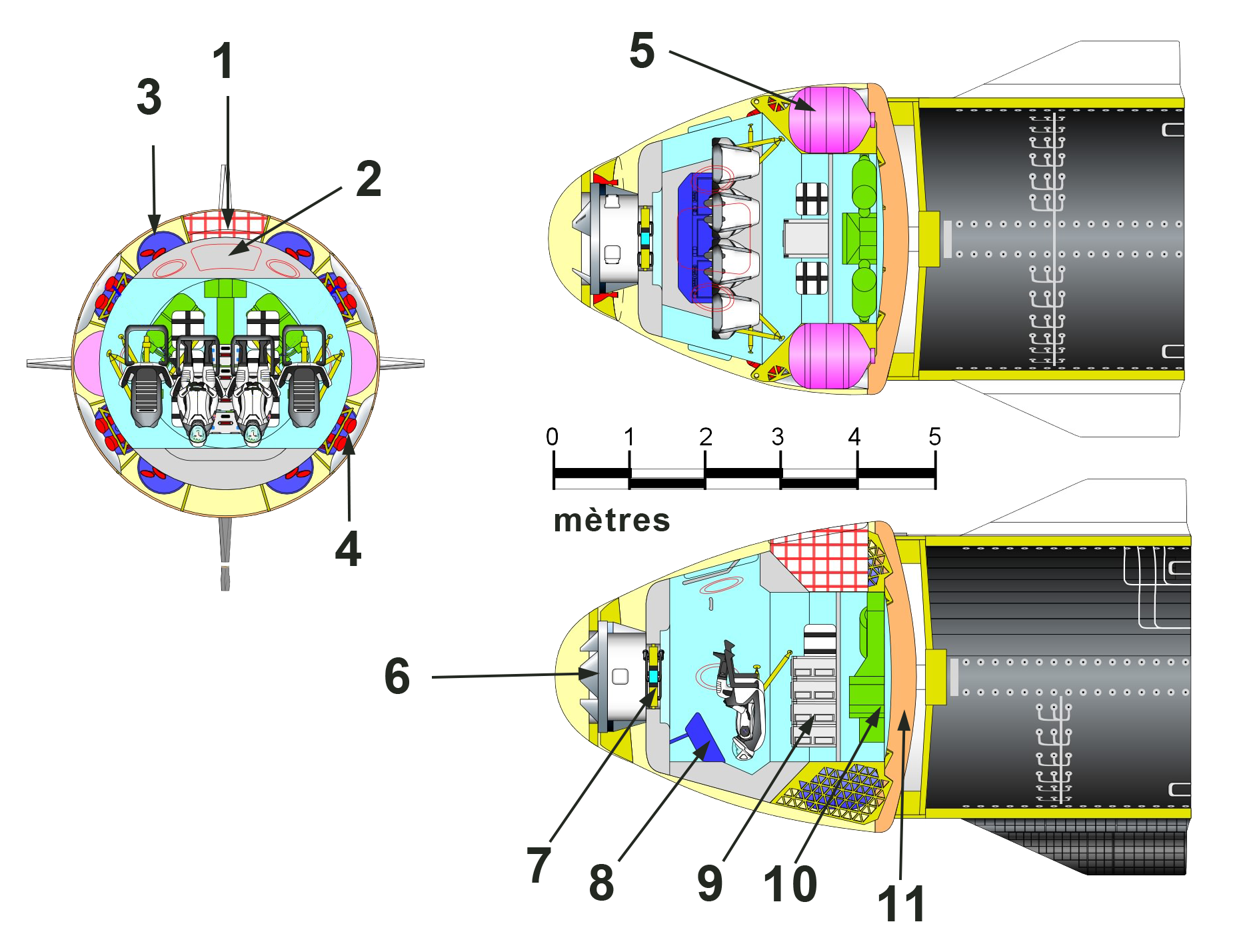
- Cross-sectional views of the Crew Dragon; 1: Parachutes, 2: Crew access hatch, 3: Draco thrusters, 4: SuperDraco engines, 5: Propellant tank, 6: IDSS port, 7: Port hatch, 8: Control panel, 9: Cargo pallet, 10: Environmental control system, 11: Heat shield

Dragon 2 is a class of partially reusable spacecraft developed, manufactured, and operated by the American space company SpaceX for flights to the International Space Station (ISS) and private spaceflight missions. The spacecraft, which consists of a reusable space capsule and an expendable trunk module, has two variants: the 4-person Crew Dragon and Cargo Dragon, a replacement for the Dragon 1 cargo capsule. The spacecraft launches atop a Falcon 9 Block 5 rocket, and the capsule returns to Earth through splashdown.

Crew Dragon's primary role is to transport crews to and from the ISS under NASA's Commercial Crew Program, a task handled by the Space Shuttle until it was retired in 2011. It will be joined by Boeing's Starliner in this role when NASA certifies it. Crew Dragon is also used for commercial flights to ISS and other destinations and is expected to be used to transport people to and from Axiom Space's planned space station.

Cargo Dragon brings cargo to the ISS under a Commercial Resupply Services-2 contract with NASA, a duty it shares with Northrop Grumman's Cygnus spacecraft. As of January 2025, it is the only reusable orbital cargo spacecraft in operation.

== Development and variants ==
There are two variants of Dragon 2: Crew Dragon and Cargo Dragon. Crew Dragon was initially called "DragonRider" and it was intended from the beginning to support a crew of seven or a combination of crew and cargo. Earlier spacecraft had a berthing port and were berthed to ISS by ISS personnel. Dragon 2 instead has an IDSS-compatible docking port to dock to the International Docking Adapter ports on ISS. It is able to perform fully autonomous rendezvous and docking with manual override ability. For typical missions, Crew Dragon remains docked to the ISS for a nominal period of 180 days, but is designed to remain on the station for up to 210 days, (Note: NASA extended the Crew-8 mission to 235 days to help mitigate the problems with the Starliner CFT mission) matching the Russian Soyuz spacecraft.

== Crew Dragon ==
Crew Dragon is capable of autonomous operation. SpaceX and NASA state that it is capable of carrying seven astronauts, but in normal operations, it carries two to four crew members, and as of January 2025, has never carried more than four.

Crew Dragon includes an integrated pusher launch escape system whose eight SuperDraco engines can push the capsule up and away from the launch vehicle in an emergency. SpaceX originally intended to use the SuperDraco engines to land Crew Dragon on land; parachutes and an ocean splashdown were envisioned for use only in the case of an aborted launch. Precision water landing under parachutes was proposed to NASA as "the baseline return and recovery approach for the first few flights" of Crew Dragon. However, propulsive landing was later cancelled, leaving ocean splashdown under parachutes as the only option.

In 2012, SpaceX was in talks with Orbital Outfitters about developing space suits to wear during launch and re-entry. Each crew member wears a custom-fitted space suit that provides cooling inside the Dragon (IVA type suit) but can also protect its wearer in a rapid cabin depressurization. For the Demo-1 mission, a test dummy was fitted with the spacesuit and sensors. The spacesuit is made from Nomex, a fire-retardant fabric similar to Kevlar.

The spacecraft's design was unveiled on May 29, 2014, during a press event at SpaceX headquarters in Hawthorne, California. In October 2014, NASA selected the Dragon spacecraft as one of the candidates to fly American astronauts to the International Space Station, under the Commercial Crew Program. In March 2022, SpaceX President Gwynne Shotwell told Reuters that "We are finishing our final (capsule), but we still are manufacturing components, because we'll be refurbishing". SpaceX later decided to build a fifth Crew Dragon capsule, to be available by 2024. SpaceX also manufactures a new expendable trunk for each flight.

SpaceX's Commercial Crew Transportation Capabilities (CCtCap) contract values each seat on a Crew Dragon flight to be around US$88 million, while the face value of each seat has been estimated by NASA's Office of Inspector General (OIG) to be around US$55 million. This contrasts with the 2014 Soyuz launch price of US$76 million per seat for NASA astronauts.

== Cargo Dragon ==
Dragon 2 was intended from the earliest design concept to carry crew, or with fewer seats, both crew and cargo.

The cargo version, dubbed Cargo Dragon, became a reality after 2014, when NASA sought bids on a second round of multi-year contracts to bring cargo to the ISS in 2020 through 2024. In January 2016, SpaceX won contracts for six of these flights, dubbed CRS-2. As of August 2025, Cargo Dragon had completed ten missions to and from the ISS with the eleventh mission in progress and more missions planned.

Cargo Dragons lack several features of the crewed variant, including seats, cockpit controls, astronaut life support systems, and SuperDraco abort engines. Cargo Dragon improves on many aspects of the original Dragon design, including the recovery and refurbishment process.

Since 2021, Cargo Dragon has been able to provide power to some payloads, saving space in the ISS and eliminating the time needed to move the payloads and set them up inside. This feature, announced on August 29, 2021, during the CRS-23 launch, is called Extend-the-Lab. "For CRS-23 there are 3 Extend-the-Lab payloads launching with the mission, and once docked, a 4th which is currently already on the space station will be added to Dragon". For the first time, Dragon Cargo Dragon C208 performed test reboost of the ISS via its aft-facing Draco thrusters on November 8, 2024, at 17:50 UTC.

On SpaceX CRS-33, Dragon included "boost kit" propulsion module in Dragon's hollow unpressurized trunk, which is typically used to carry larger experiments that are robotically attached to the outside of the ISS. The kit comprises six dedicated propellant tanks containing hydrazine and nitrogen tetroxide, a helium pressurant tank, and two Draco thrusters aligned with the station's velocity vector. The boost kit is based on, but operates independently from Dragon's primary propulsion system. When activated, the system can add about 9 meters per second (20 mph) to the ISS's orbital velocity, equivalent to the total reboost impulse of roughly one-and-a-half Russian Progress cargo vehicles, which are normally responsible for orbit maintenance. The kit carries enough propellant to provide about one-third to one-fourth of the ISS's annual reboost needs.

The US Deorbit Vehicle is a planned Cargo Dragon variant that will be used to deorbit the ISS and direct any remnants into the "spacecraft cemetery", a remote area of the southern Pacific Ocean. The vehicle will attach to the ISS using one of the Cargo Dragon vehicles, which will be paired with a longer trunk module equipped with 30 additional Draco thrusters (in addition to the normal 16). It will have a total mass of 30,000 kg (66,000 lb) including 16,000 kg (35,000 lb) of propellant, nearly six times the normal load. NASA plans to launch the deorbit vehicle in 2030 where it will remain attached, dormant, for about a year as the station's orbit naturally decays to 220 km (140 mi). The spacecraft is to then conduct one or more orientation burns to lower the perigee to 150 km (93 mi), followed by a final deorbiting burn to push the station into the ocean. In June 2024, NASA awarded a contract worth up to $843 million to SpaceX to build the deorbit vehicle as it works to secure funding.

== Design ==
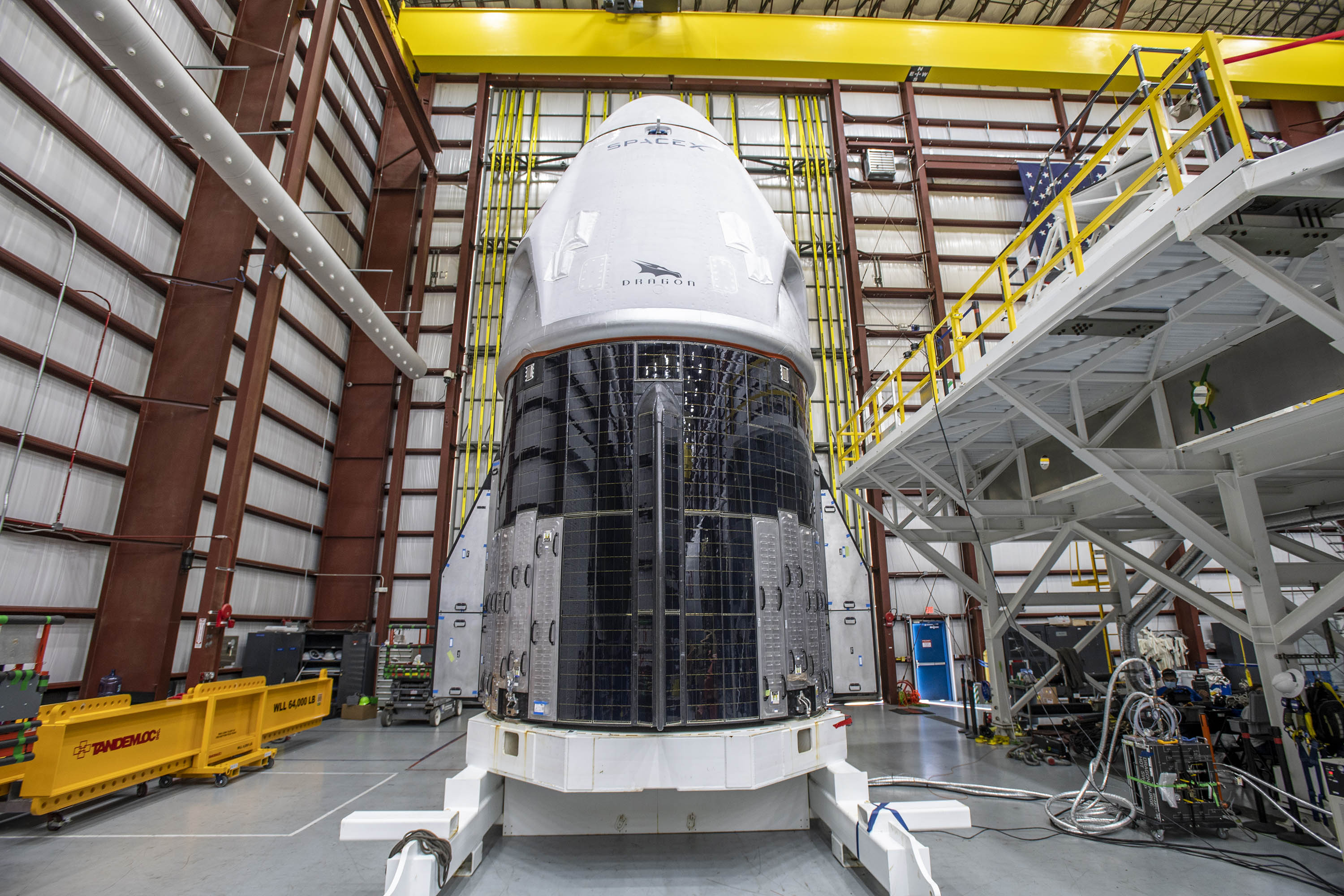
Crew Dragon Resilience in the LC-39A Horizontal Integration Facility in November 2020 preparing for the launch of Crew-1.

Currently operational crewed spacecraft (at least orbital class)

SpaceX, which aims to dramatically lower space transportation costs, designed Dragon 2 to be reused, not discarded as is typical of spacecraft. It is composed of a reusable capsule and a disposable trunk.

SpaceX and NASA initially certified the capsule to be used for five missions. As of March 2024, they are working to certify it for up to fifteen missions.

To maximize cost-effectiveness, SpaceX incorporated several innovative design choices. The Crew Dragon employs eight side-mounted SuperDraco engines for its emergency escape system, eliminating the need for a traditional, disposable escape tower. Furthermore, instead of housing the critical and expensive life support, thruster, and propellant storage systems in a disposable service module, Dragon 2 integrates them within the capsule for reuse.

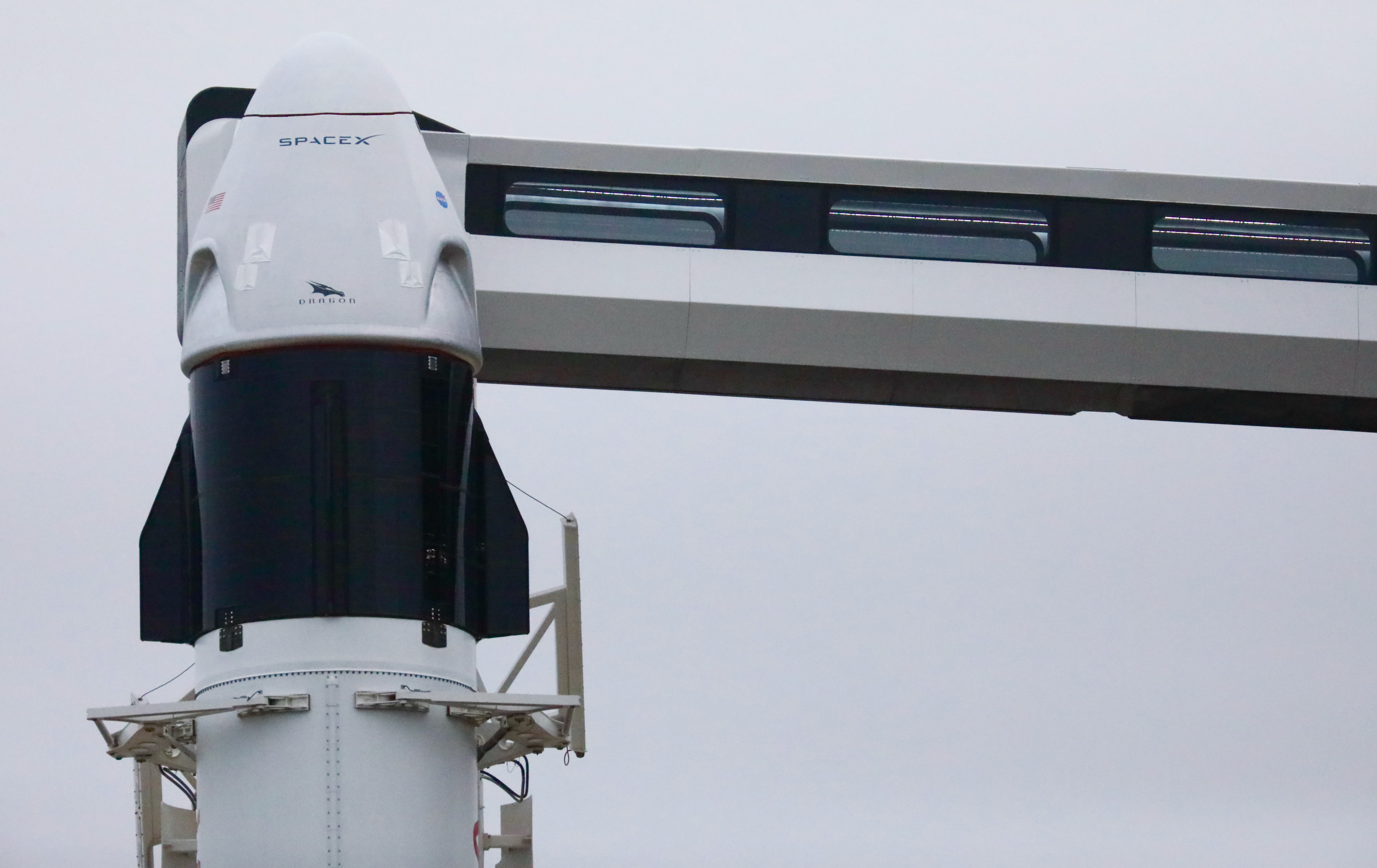
Crew Dragon Resilience, with the solar panels integrated in its trunk

The trunk serves as an adapter between the capsule and the Falcon 9 rocket's second stage and also includes solar panels, a heat-dissipation radiator, and fins to provide aerodynamic stability during emergency aborts. Dragon 2 integrates solar arrays directly into the trunk's structure, replacing the deployable panels of its predecessor, Dragon 1. On Cargo Dragon missions, the trunk can also be used to transport unpressurized payloads, such as the Roll Out Solar Array, or it can be fitted with a "boost kit" to perform reboosts of the ISS. The trunk is connected to the capsule using a fitting known as "the claw".

The typical Crew Dragon mission includes four astronauts: a commander who leads the mission and has primary responsibility for operating the spacecraft, a pilot who serves as backup for both command and operations, and two mission specialists who may have specific duties assigned depending on the mission. However, the Crew Dragon can fly missions with just two astronauts as needed, and in an emergency, up to seven astronauts could return to Earth from the ISS on Dragon.

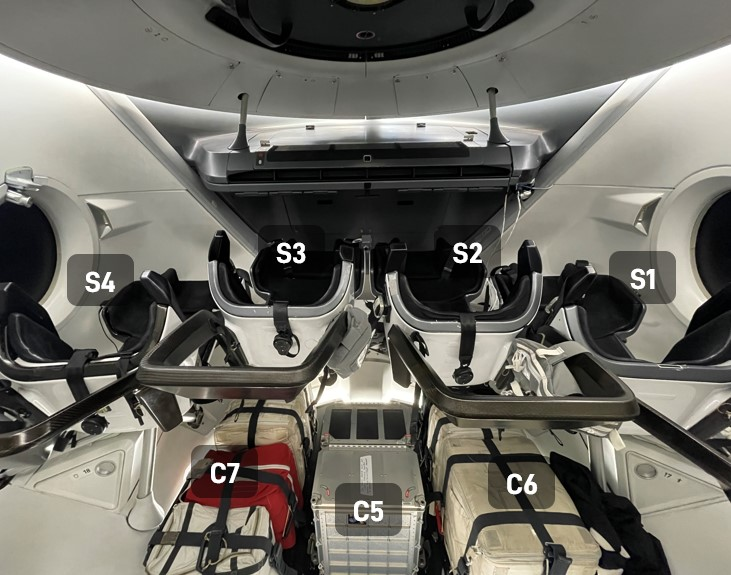
Crew Dragon interior configuration showing four standard crew seats (S1-S4) and three cargo pallet locations (C5-C7)

On the Crew Dragon, above the two center seats (occupied by the commander and pilot), there is a three-screen control panel. Below the seats is the cargo pallet, where around 230 kilograms (500 lb) of items can be stowed. On the ground, crews enter the capsule through a side hatch. The capsule's ceiling includes a small space toilet (with privacy curtain), and an International Docking System Standard (IDSS) port. For private spaceflight missions not requiring ISS docking, the IDSS port can be replaced with a 1.2-meter (3 ft 11 in) domed plexiglass window offering panoramic views, similar to the ISS Cupola. Additionally, SpaceX has developed a "Skywalker" hatch for missions involving extravehicular activities.

The Cargo Dragon is loaded from the side hatch as well as through the IDSS port on the ceiling. It lacks the control panels, life support, windows, and seats of the Crew Dragon.

The spacecraft can be operated in full vacuum, and the crew wears SpaceX-designed space suits to protect them from a rapid cabin depressurization emergency event. The spacecraft has also been designed to be able to land safely with a leak "of up to an equivalent orifice of 6.35 mm [0.25 in] in diameter".

The spacecraft's nose cone protects the docking port and four forward-facing thrusters during ascent and reentry. This component pivots open for in-space operations. Dragon 2's propellant and helium pressurant for emergency abort and orbital maneuvers are stored in composite-carbon-overwrap titanium spherical tanks at the capsule's base in an area known as the service section.

For launch aborts, the capsule relies on eight SuperDraco engines arranged in four redundant pairs. Each engine generates 71 kN (16,000 lb_{f}) of thrust. Sixteen smaller Draco thrusters placed around the spacecraft control its attitude and perform orbital maneuvers.

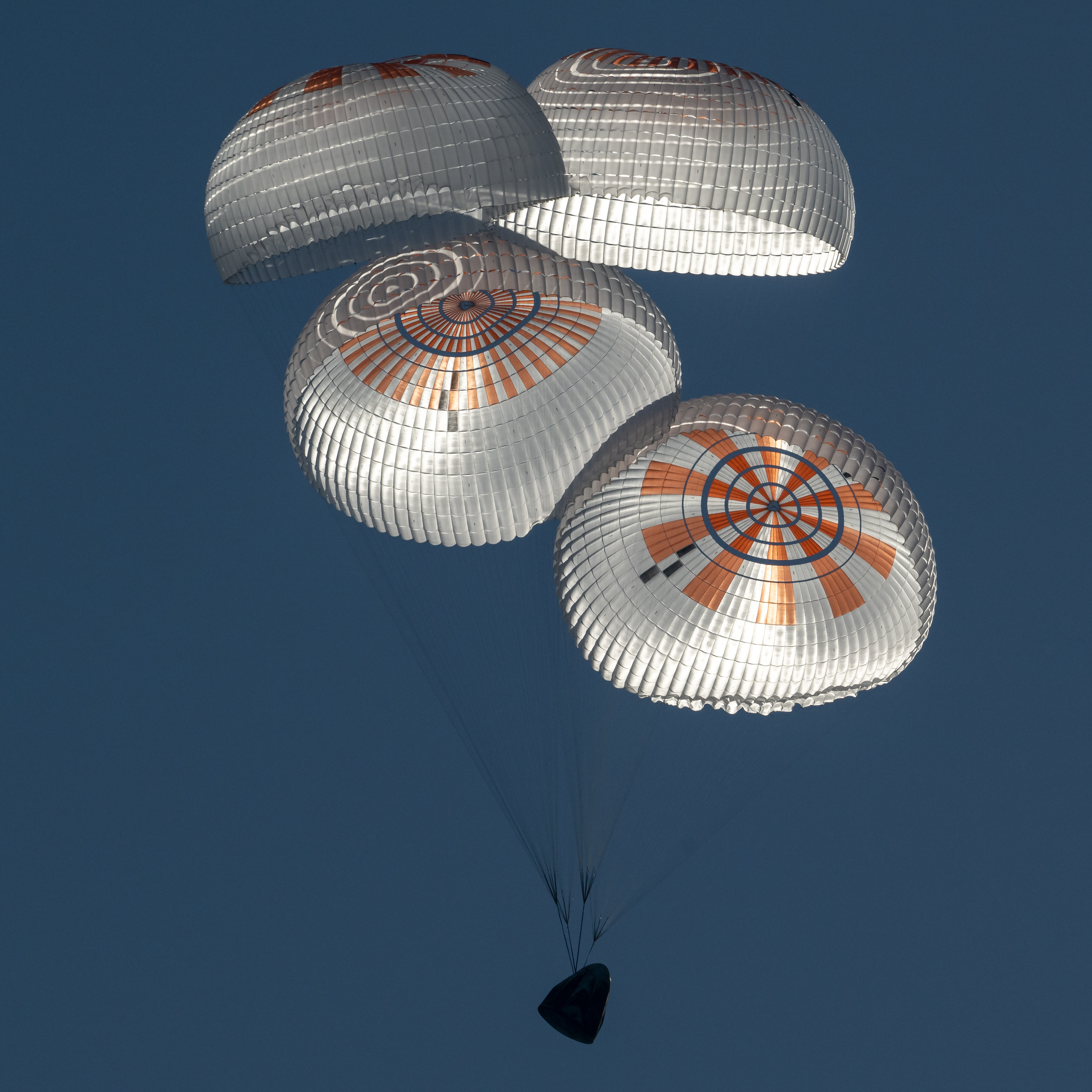
Crew Dragon Freedom with its parachutes deployed

When the capsule returns to Earth, a PICA-3 heat shield safeguards the capsule during reentry. Dragon 2 uses a total of six parachutes (two drogues and four mains) to decelerate after atmospheric entry and before splashdown, compared to the five used by Dragon 1. The additional parachute was required by NASA as a safety measure after a Dragon 1 suffered a parachute malfunction. The company also went through two rounds of parachute development before being certified to fly with crew. In 2024, the use of the SuperDraco thrusters for propulsive landing was enabled again, but only as a backup for parachute emergencies.

== Crewed flights ==
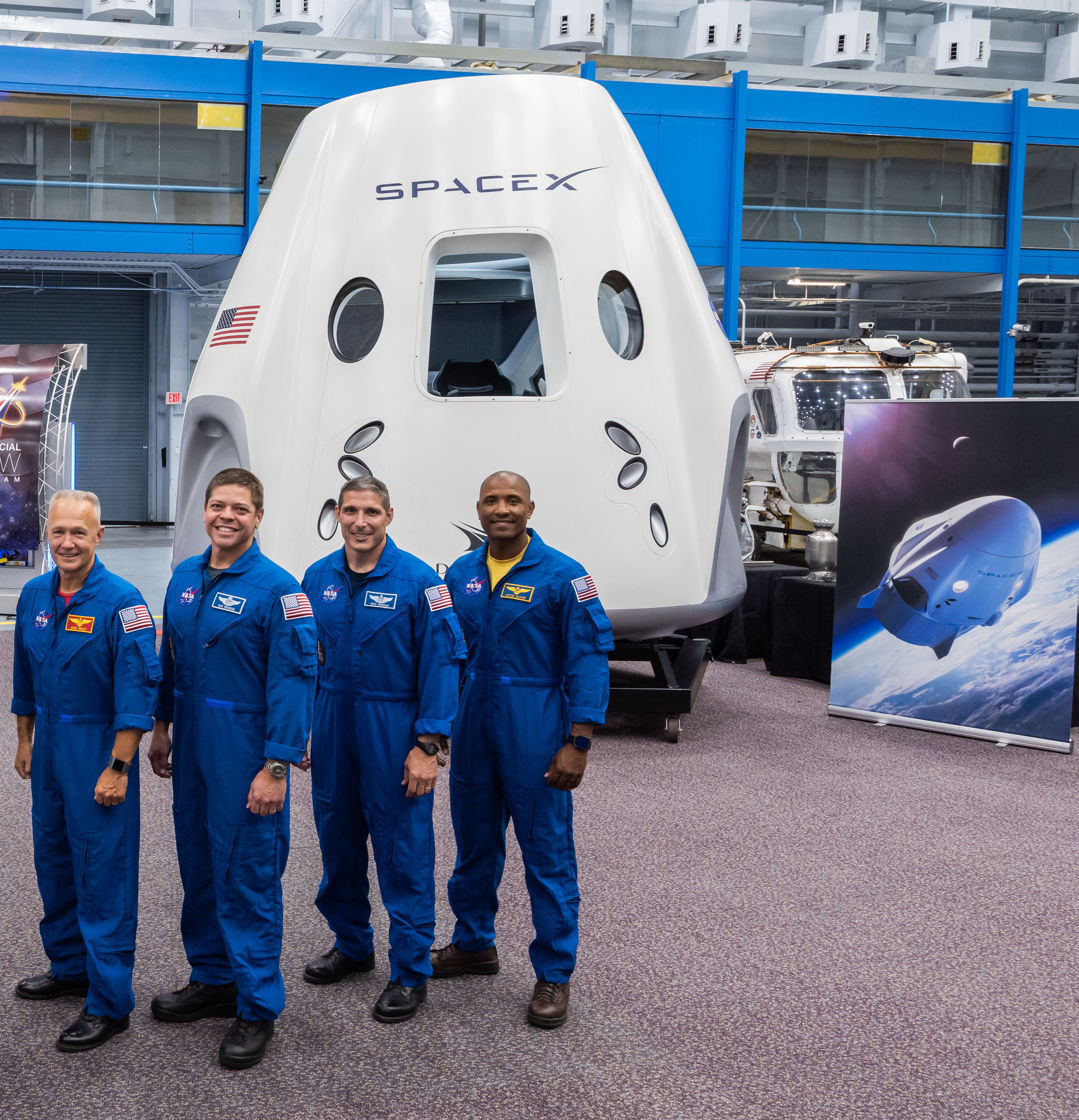
The Crew Dragon mockup (background) and four of the astronauts of its first two crewed missions (foreground), from left to right: Doug Hurley, Bob Behnken, Michael S. Hopkins, and Victor Glover

Crew Dragon is used by both commercial and government customers. Axiom Space launches commercial astronauts to the ISS and intends to eventually launch to their own private space station. NASA flights to the ISS have four astronauts, with the added payload mass and volume used to carry pressurized cargo.

On September 16, 2014, NASA announced that SpaceX and Boeing had been selected to provide crew transportation to the ISS. SpaceX was to receive up to US$2.6 billion under this contract to provide development test flights and up to six operational flights. Dragon was the less expensive proposal, but NASA's William H. Gerstenmaier considered the Boeing Starliner proposal the stronger of the two. However, Crew Dragon's first operational flight, SpaceX Crew-1, was on November 16, 2020, after several test flights, while Starliner suffered multiple problems and delays, with its first operational flight slipping to no earlier than 2026.

In a departure from the prior NASA practice, where construction contracts with commercial firms led to direct NASA operation of the spacecraft, NASA is purchasing space transport services from SpaceX, including construction, launch, and operation of the Dragon 2.

NASA approved a new propellant loading procedure due to the Falcon 9 rocket's novel use of superchilled propellants. Unlike earlier NASA spacecraft, such as the Saturn V and Space Shuttle—where propellants were fully loaded hours before launch and before astronauts boarded—on the Falcon 9, propellants are loaded just before launch to keep the liquid oxygen near −340 °F (−206.7 °C) and the kerosene near 20 °F (−7 °C). Propellant loading begins approximately 40 minutes before liftoff, with the launch escape system active to ensure the crew can be safely pulled away from the rocket in the event of an emergency during fuel loading.

The first uncrewed test mission, Demo-1, launched to the International Space Station (ISS) on March 2, 2019. After schedule slips, the first crewed flight, Demo-2, launched on May 30, 2020.

== Testing ==
SpaceX planned a series of four flight tests for the Crew Dragon: a pad abort test, an uncrewed orbital flight to the ISS, an in-flight abort test, and finally, a crewed flight to the ISS, which was initially planned for July 2019, but after a Dragon capsule explosion, was delayed to May 2020.

=== Pad abort test ===
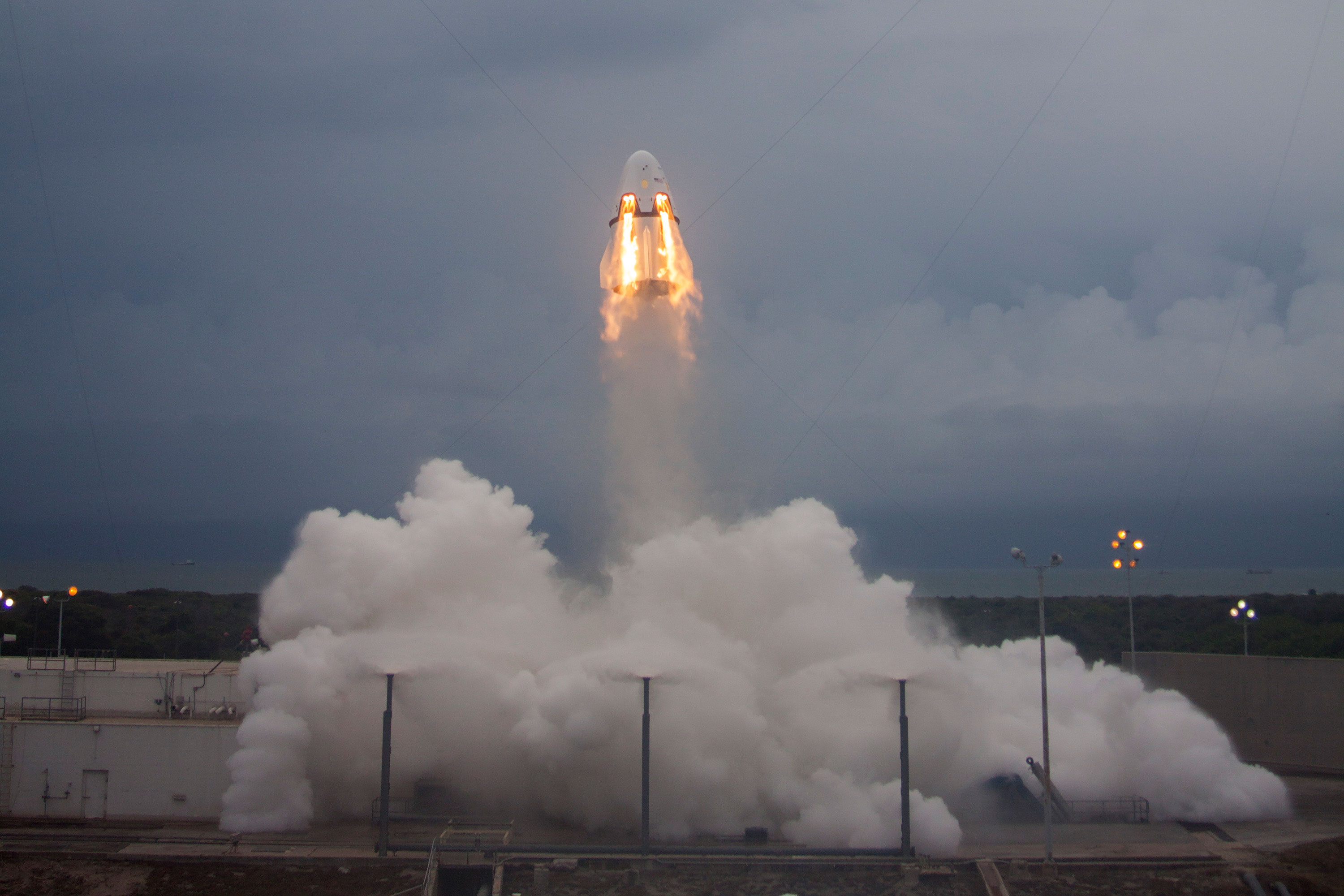
Pad abort test of a Dragon 2 article on May 6, 2015, at CCAFS, SLC-40

The pad abort test was conducted successfully on May 6, 2015, at SpaceX's leased SLC-40 launch site. Dragon landed safely in the ocean to the east of the launchpad 99 seconds after ignition of the SuperDraco engines. While a flight-like Dragon 2 and trunk were used for the pad abort test, they rested atop a truss structure for the test rather than a full Falcon 9 rocket. A crash test dummy embedded with a suite of sensors was placed inside the test vehicle to record acceleration loads and forces at the crew seat, while the remaining six seats were loaded with weights to simulate full-passenger-load weight. The test objective was to demonstrate sufficient total impulse, thrust and controllability to conduct a safe pad abort. A fuel mixture ratio issue was detected after the flight in one of the eight SuperDraco engines causing it to under perform, but did not materially affect the flight.

On November 24, 2015, SpaceX conducted a test of Dragon 2's hovering abilities at the firm's rocket development facility in McGregor, Texas. In a video, the spacecraft is shown suspended by a hoisting cable and igniting its SuperDraco engines to hover for about 5 seconds, balancing on its 8 engines firing at reduced thrust to compensate exactly for gravity. The test vehicle was the same capsule that performed the pad abort test earlier in 2015; it was nicknamed DragonFly.

=== Demo-1: orbital flight test ===
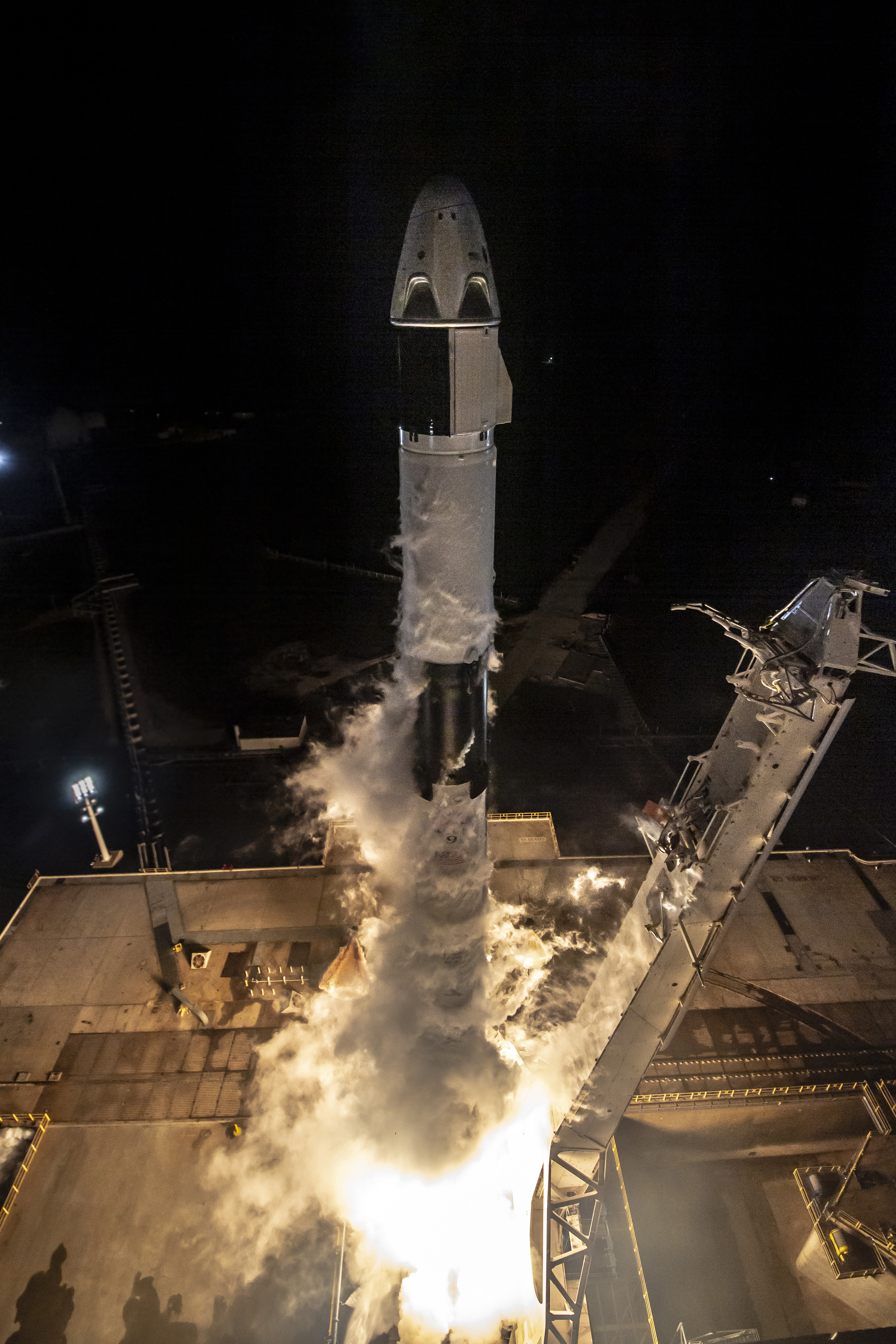
Launch of Demo-1, Crew Dragon's maiden spaceflight

In 2015, NASA named its first Commercial Crew astronaut cadre of four veteran astronauts to work with SpaceX and Boeing – Robert Behnken, Eric Boe, Sunita Williams, and Douglas Hurley. The Demo-1 mission completed the last milestone of the Commercial Crew Development program, paving the way to starting commercial services under an upcoming ISS Crew Transportation Services contract. On August 3, 2018, NASA announced the crew for the DM-2 mission. The crew of two consisted of NASA astronauts Bob Behnken and Doug Hurley. Behnken previously flew as mission specialist on the STS-123 and the STS-130 missions. Hurley previously flew as a pilot on the STS-127 mission and on the final Space Shuttle mission, STS-135.

The first orbital test of Crew Dragon was an uncrewed mission, commonly called "Demo-1" and launched on March 2, 2019. The spacecraft tested the approach and automated docking procedures with the ISS, remained docked until March 8, 2019, then conducted the full re-entry, splashdown and recovery steps to qualify for a crewed mission. Life-support systems were monitored for the entirety the test flight. The same capsule was planned to be re-used in June 2019 for an in-flight abort test before it exploded on April 20, 2019.

=== Explosion during testing ===
On April 20, 2019, Crew Dragon C204, the capsule used in the Demo-1 mission, was destroyed in an explosion during static fire testing at the Landing Zone 1 facility. On the day of the explosion, the initial testing of the Crew Dragon's Draco thrusters was successful, with the anomaly occurring during the test of the SuperDraco abort system.

Telemetry, high-speed camera footage, and analysis of recovered debris indicate the problem occurred when a small amount of dinitrogen tetroxide leaked into a helium line used to pressurize the propellant tanks. The leakage apparently occurred during pre-test processing. As a result, the pressurization of the system 100 ms before firing damaged a check valve and resulted in the explosion.

SpaceX modified the Dragon 2 replacing check valves with burst discs, which are designed for single use, and the adding of flaps to each SuperDraco to seal the thrusters prior to splashdown, preventing water intrusion. The SuperDraco engine test was repeated on November 13, 2019, with Crew Dragon C205. The test was successful, showing that the modifications made to the vehicle were successful.

Since the destroyed capsule had been slated for use in the upcoming in-flight abort test, the explosion and investigation delayed that test and the subsequent crewed orbital test.

=== In-flight abort test ===
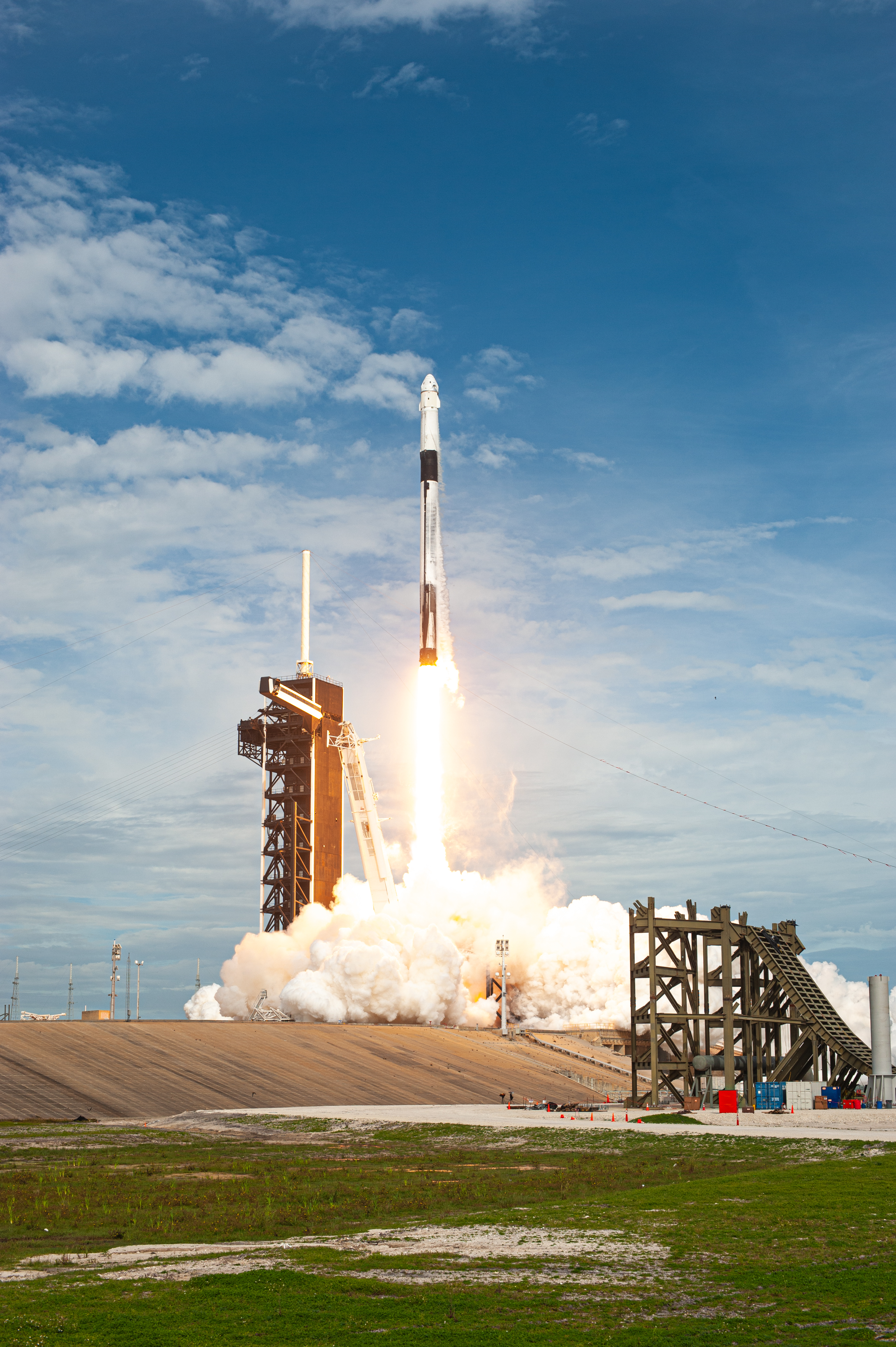
Liftoff of Crew Dragon in-flight abort test

The Crew Dragon in-flight abort test was launched on January 19, 2020, at 15:30 UTC from LC-39A on a suborbital trajectory to conduct a separation and abort scenario in the troposphere at transonic velocities shortly after passing through max Q, where the vehicle experiences maximum aerodynamic pressure. The Dragon 2 used its SuperDraco abort engines to push itself away from the Falcon 9 after an intentional premature engine cutoff, after which the Falcon was destroyed by aerodynamic forces. The Dragon followed its suborbital trajectory to apogee, at which point the spacecraft's trunk was jettisoned. The smaller Draco engines were then used to orient the vehicle for the descent. All major functions were executed, including separation, engine firings, parachute deployment, and landing.

Dragon 2 splashed down at 15:38:54 UTC just off the Florida coast in the Atlantic Ocean. The test objective was to demonstrate the ability to safely move away from the ascending rocket under the most challenging atmospheric conditions of the flight trajectory, imposing the worst structural stress of a real flight on the rocket and spacecraft. The abort test was performed using a Falcon 9 Block 5 rocket with a fully fueled second stage with a mass simulator replacing the Merlin engine.

Earlier, this test had been scheduled before the uncrewed orbital test, however, SpaceX and NASA considered it safer to use a flight representative capsule rather than the test article from the pad abort test.

This test was previously planned to use the capsule C204 from Demo-1, however, C204 was destroyed in an explosion during a static fire testing on April 20, 2019. Capsule C205, originally planned for Demo-2 was used for the In-Flight Abort Test with C206 being planned for use during Demo-2. This was the final flight test of the spacecraft before it began carrying astronauts to the International Space Station under NASA's Commercial Crew Program.

Prior to the flight test, teams completed launch day procedures for the first crewed flight test, from suit-up to launch pad operations. The joint teams conducted full data reviews that needed to be completed prior to NASA astronauts flying on the system during SpaceX's Demo-2 mission.

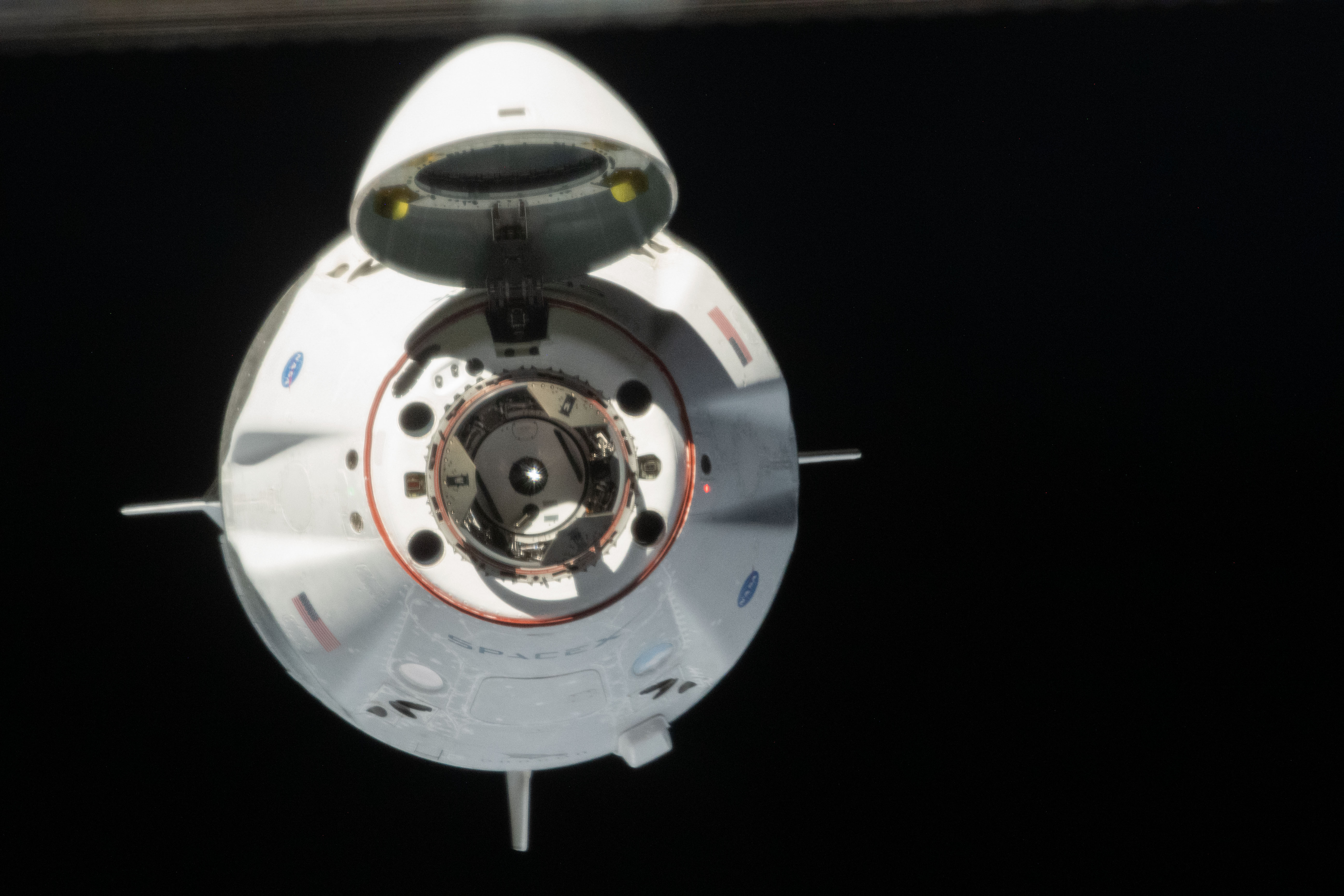
SpaceX Crew Dragon Endeavour as it approached the International Space Station

=== Demo-2: crewed orbital flight test ===
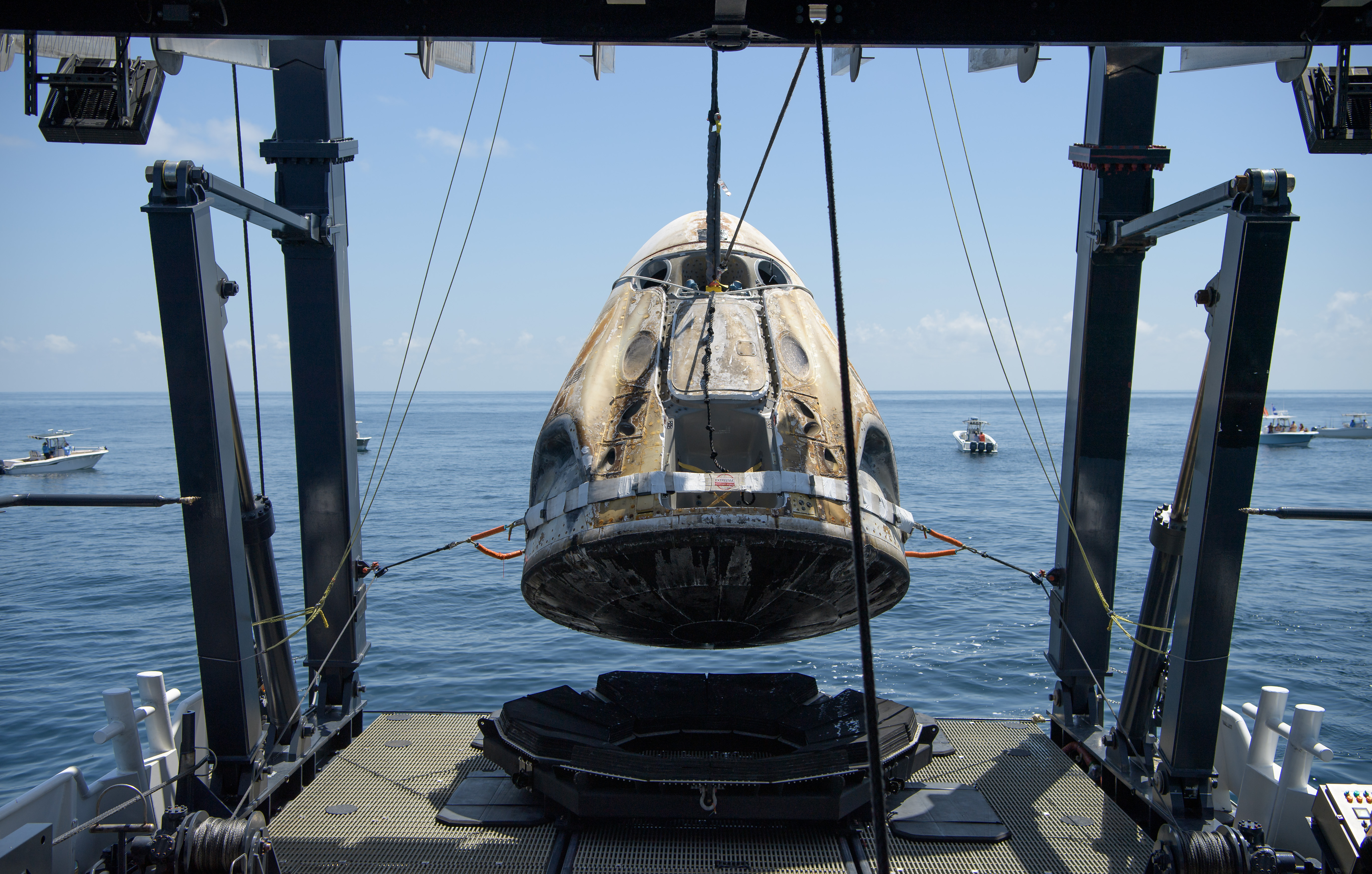
Endeavour capsule being recovered after splashdown

On April 17, 2020, NASA administrator Jim Bridenstine announced the first crewed Crew Dragon Demo-2 to the International Space Station would launch on May 27, 2020. Astronauts Bob Behnken and Doug Hurley crewed the mission, marking the first crewed launch to the International Space Station from U.S. soil since STS-135 in July 2011. The original launch was postponed to May 30, 2020, due to weather conditions at the launch site. The second launch attempt was successful, with capsule C206, later named Endeavour by the crew, launching on 30 May 2020 19:22 UTC. The capsule successfully docked with the International Space Station on May 31, 2020, at 14:27 UTC. On August 2, 2020, Crew Dragon undocked and splashed-down successfully in the Atlantic Ocean. Launching in the Dragon 2 spacecraft was described by astronaut Bob Behnken as "smooth off the pad" but "we were definitely driving and riding a dragon all the way up ... a little bit less g's [than the Space Shuttle] but more 'alive' is probably the best way I would describe it".

Regarding descent in the spacecraft, Behnken stated, "Once we descended a little bit into the atmosphere, Dragon really came alive. It started to fire thrusters and keep us pointed in the appropriate direction. The atmosphere starts to make noise—you can hear that rumble outside the vehicle. And as the vehicle tries to control, you feel a little bit of that shimmy in your body. ... We could feel those small rolls and pitches and yaws—all those little motions were things we picked up on inside the vehicle. ... All the separation events, from the trunk separation through the parachute firings, were very much like getting hit in the back of the chair with a baseball bat ... pretty light for the trunk separation but with the parachutes it was a pretty significant jolt".

== List of vehicles ==
The following is a list of prototype, Crew Dragon, and Cargo Dragon vehicles.

No.	Name	Type	Status	Flights	Flight time	Total flight time	Notes	Cat.
C201	DragonFly	Prototype	Retired	1	99s (Pad Abort Test)	99s	Prototype used for pad abort test at Cape Canaveral and tethered hover tests at the McGregor Test Facility.	
C202	None	Prototype	Retired	N/A	N/A	N/A	Pressure vessel qualification module used for structural testing.	
C203	None	Prototype	In use	N/A	N/A	N/A	Environmental control and life support system testing module, still in use for human-in-the-loop testing.	
C204	None	Crew	Destroyed	1	6d 5h 56m (Demo-1)	6d 5h 56m	First Dragon 2 to fly in space. Only flight was Demo-1; accidentally destroyed during ground testing of the abort thrusters weeks after the flight.	
C205	None	Crew	Retired	1	8m 54s (In-Flight Abort Test)	8m 54s	Was originally to be used on Demo-2 but instead flew the Crew Dragon In-Flight Abort Test due to the destruction of C204 and was retired afterwards.	
C206	Endeavour	Crew	Active	6	63d 23h 25m (Demo-2)	868d 14h 13m	First vehicle to carry crew; named after Space Shuttle Endeavour. First flown during Crew Demo-2. Has since flown Crew-2, Axiom-1, Crew-6, Crew-8, and Crew-11. First Dragon to fly beyond the initial certification of 5 flights per Dragon.	
C206	Endeavour	Crew	Active	6	199d 17h 44m (Crew-2)	868d 14h 13m	First vehicle to carry crew; named after Space Shuttle Endeavour. First flown during Crew Demo-2. Has since flown Crew-2, Axiom-1, Crew-6, Crew-8, and Crew-11. First Dragon to fly beyond the initial certification of 5 flights per Dragon.	
C206	Endeavour	Crew	Active	6	17d 1h 49m (Axiom-1)	868d 14h 13m	First vehicle to carry crew; named after Space Shuttle Endeavour. First flown during Crew Demo-2. Has since flown Crew-2, Axiom-1, Crew-6, Crew-8, and Crew-11. First Dragon to fly beyond the initial certification of 5 flights per Dragon.	
C206	Endeavour	Crew	Active	6	185d 22h 43m (Crew-6)	868d 14h 13m	First vehicle to carry crew; named after Space Shuttle Endeavour. First flown during Crew Demo-2. Has since flown Crew-2, Axiom-1, Crew-6, Crew-8, and Crew-11. First Dragon to fly beyond the initial certification of 5 flights per Dragon.	
C206	Endeavour	Crew	Active	6	235d 3h 35m (Crew-8)	868d 14h 13m	First vehicle to carry crew; named after Space Shuttle Endeavour. First flown during Crew Demo-2. Has since flown Crew-2, Axiom-1, Crew-6, Crew-8, and Crew-11. First Dragon to fly beyond the initial certification of 5 flights per Dragon.	
C206	Endeavour	Crew	Active	6	166d 16h 57m (Crew-11)	868d 14h 13m	First vehicle to carry crew; named after Space Shuttle Endeavour. First flown during Crew Demo-2. Has since flown Crew-2, Axiom-1, Crew-6, Crew-8, and Crew-11. First Dragon to fly beyond the initial certification of 5 flights per Dragon.	
C207	Resilience	Crew	Active	4	167d 6h 29m (Crew-1)	178d 19h 17m	First flew on Crew-1 on November 16, 2020. Has since flown private spaceflight missions Inspiration4, Polaris Dawn, and Fram2.	
C207	Resilience	Crew	Active	4	2d 23h 3m (Inspiration4)	178d 19h 17m	First flew on Crew-1 on November 16, 2020. Has since flown private spaceflight missions Inspiration4, Polaris Dawn, and Fram2.	
C207	Resilience	Crew	Active	4	4d 22h 13m (Polaris Dawn)	178d 19h 17m	First flew on Crew-1 on November 16, 2020. Has since flown private spaceflight missions Inspiration4, Polaris Dawn, and Fram2.	
C207	Resilience	Crew	Active	4	3d 14h 32m (Fram2)	178d 19h 17m	First flew on Crew-1 on November 16, 2020. Has since flown private spaceflight missions Inspiration4, Polaris Dawn, and Fram2.	
C208	None	Cargo	Active	5	38d 9h 8m (CRS-21)	175d 13h 52m	First Cargo Dragon 2, which flew the CRS-21, CRS-23, CRS-25, CRS-28, and CRS-31 missions.	
C208	None	Cargo	Active	5	32d 19h 42m (CRS-23)	175d 13h 52m	First Cargo Dragon 2, which flew the CRS-21, CRS-23, CRS-25, CRS-28, and CRS-31 missions.	
C208	None	Cargo	Active	5	36d 18h 8m (CRS-25)	175d 13h 52m	First Cargo Dragon 2, which flew the CRS-21, CRS-23, CRS-25, CRS-28, and CRS-31 missions.	
C208	None	Cargo	Active	5	24d 22h 43m (CRS-28)	175d 13h 52m	First Cargo Dragon 2, which flew the CRS-21, CRS-23, CRS-25, CRS-28, and CRS-31 missions.	
C208	None	Cargo	Active	5	42d 16h 10m (CRS-31)	175d 13h 52m	First Cargo Dragon 2, which flew the CRS-21, CRS-23, CRS-25, CRS-28, and CRS-31 missions.	
C209	None	Cargo	Active	6	36d 9h 59m (CRS-22)	208d 9h 41m	Second Cargo Dragon 2, which flew the CRS-22, CRS-24, CRS-27, CRS-30, CRS-32, and CRS-34 missions.	
C209	None	Cargo	Active	6	34d 10h 57m (CRS-24)	208d 9h 41m	Second Cargo Dragon 2, which flew the CRS-22, CRS-24, CRS-27, CRS-30, CRS-32, and CRS-34 missions.	
C209	None	Cargo	Active	6	31d 20h 28m (CRS-27)	208d 9h 41m	Second Cargo Dragon 2, which flew the CRS-22, CRS-24, CRS-27, CRS-30, CRS-32, and CRS-34 missions.	
C209	None	Cargo	Active	6	39d 8h 43m (CRS-30)	208d 9h 41m	Second Cargo Dragon 2, which flew the CRS-22, CRS-24, CRS-27, CRS-30, CRS-32, and CRS-34 missions.	
C209	None	Cargo	Active	6	33d 21h 29m (CRS-32)	208d 9h 41m	Second Cargo Dragon 2, which flew the CRS-22, CRS-24, CRS-27, CRS-30, CRS-32, and CRS-34 missions.	
C209	None	Cargo	Active	6	32d 10h 5m (CRS-34)	208d 9h 41m	Second Cargo Dragon 2, which flew the CRS-22, CRS-24, CRS-27, CRS-30, CRS-32, and CRS-34 missions.	
C210	Endurance	Crew	Active	4	176d 2h 39m (Crew-3)	680d 7h 28m	First flew on Crew-3 on November 11, 2021. Has since flown Crew-5, Crew-7, and Crew-10.	
C210	Endurance	Crew	Active	4	157d 10h 1m (Crew-5)	680d 7h 28m	First flew on Crew-3 on November 11, 2021. Has since flown Crew-5, Crew-7, and Crew-10.	
C210	Endurance	Crew	Active	4	199d 2h 20m (Crew-7)	680d 7h 28m	First flew on Crew-3 on November 11, 2021. Has since flown Crew-5, Crew-7, and Crew-10.	
C210	Endurance	Crew	Active	4	147d 16h 29m (Crew-10)	680d 7h 28m	First flew on Crew-3 on November 11, 2021. Has since flown Crew-5, Crew-7, and Crew-10.	
C211	None	Cargo	Active	4	45d 14h 58m (CRS-26)	314d 19h 30m	Third Cargo Dragon 2, which flew the CRS-26, CRS-29, CRS-33, and CRS-35 missions.	
C211	None	Cargo	Active	4	42d 16h 5m (CRS-29)	314d 19h 30m	Third Cargo Dragon 2, which flew the CRS-26, CRS-29, CRS-33, and CRS-35 missions.	
C211	None	Cargo	Active	4	187d 4h 59m (CRS-33)	314d 19h 30m	Third Cargo Dragon 2, which flew the CRS-26, CRS-29, CRS-33, and CRS-35 missions.	
C211	None	Cargo	Active	4	39d 11h 29m (CRS-35)	314d 19h 30m	Third Cargo Dragon 2, which flew the CRS-26, CRS-29, CRS-33, and CRS-35 missions.	
C212	Freedom	Crew	Active	5	170d 13h 2m (Crew-4)	609d 20h 6m	First flew on Crew-4 on April 24, 2022. Has since flown Axiom-2, Axiom-3, Crew-9, and Crew-12.	
C212	Freedom	Crew	Active	5	9d 5h 27m (Axiom-2)	609d 20h 6m	First flew on Crew-4 on April 24, 2022. Has since flown Axiom-2, Axiom-3, Crew-9, and Crew-12.	
C212	Freedom	Crew	Active	5	21d 15h 40m (Axiom-3)	609d 20h 6m	First flew on Crew-4 on April 24, 2022. Has since flown Axiom-2, Axiom-3, Crew-9, and Crew-12.	
C212	Freedom	Crew	Active	5	171d 4h 39m (Crew-9)	609d 20h 6m	First flew on Crew-4 on April 24, 2022. Has since flown Axiom-2, Axiom-3, Crew-9, and Crew-12.	
C212	Freedom	Crew	Active	5	237d 5h 18m (Crew-12)	609d 20h 6m	First flew on Crew-4 on April 24, 2022. Has since flown Axiom-2, Axiom-3, Crew-9, and Crew-12.	
C213	Grace	Crew	Active (docked to ISS)	2	20d 2h 59m (Axiom-4)	71 days, 11 hours, 42 minutes [] (currently in space)	First flew on Axiom-4 on June 25, 2025. Has since flown Crew-13.	
C213	Grace	Crew	Active (docked to ISS)	2	51d 8h 44m (Crew-13, in progress)	71 days, 11 hours, 42 minutes [] (currently in space)	First flew on Axiom-4 on June 25, 2025. Has since flown Crew-13.	

== List of flights ==
List includes only completed or currently manifested missions. Dates are listed in UTC, and for future events, they are the earliest possible opportunities (also known as NET dates) and may change.

=== Crew Dragon flights ===
Mission and patch	Capsule	Launch date Landing date Duration	Launch pad	Landing site	Destination	Remarks	Crew	Outcome
Pad Abort Test (patch)	C201; DragonFly	May 6, 2015	SLC-40	Atlantic Ocean	—N/a	Simulating an escape from a rocket failure on the ground, Crew Dragon's SuperDraco engines lifted the capsule from a ground pad at SLC-40 and propelled it to a safe splashdown in the nearby ocean.	—N/a	Success
Demo-1 (patch)	C204	March 2, 2019; March 8, 2019; 6d 5h 56m	LC-39A	Atlantic Ocean	ISS	Uncrewed orbital test flight, successfully docked with the ISS.	—N/a	Success
In-Flight; Abort Test (patch)	C205	January 19, 2020	LC-39A	Atlantic Ocean	—N/a	Booster was commanded to simulate an in-flight engine failure. In response, Crew Dragon's SuperDraco engines fired successfully, propelling the capsule away to a safe splashdown.	—N/a	Success
Demo-2	C206‑1 Endeavour	May 30, 2020; August 2, 2020; 63d 23h 25m	LC-39A	Gulf of Mexico	ISS	First crewed flight test of Dragon 2. The mission was extended from two weeks to nine to allow the crew to bolster activity on the ISS ahead of Crew-1.	Doug Hurley; Bob Behnken	Success
Crew-1	C207‑1 Resilience	November 16, 2020; May 2, 2021; 167d 6h 29m	LC-39A	Gulf of Mexico	ISS	First operational Commercial Crew flight.	Michael Hopkins; Victor Glover; Soichi Noguchi; Shannon Walker	Success
Crew-2	C206‑2 Endeavour	April 23, 2021; November 9, 2021; 199d 17h 44m	LC-39A	Gulf of Mexico	ISS	First reuse of a capsule and booster rocket.	Shane Kimbrough; Megan McArthur; Akihiko Hoshide; Thomas Pesquet	Success
Inspiration4 (patch 1) (patch 2)	C207‑2 Resilience	September 16, 2021; September 18, 2021; 2d 23h 3m	LC-39A	Atlantic Ocean	Low Earth orbit	The first fully private, all-civilian orbital flight. Crew reached a 585 km (364 mi) orbit and conducted science experiments and public outreach activities for three days. First standalone orbital Crew Dragon flight and the first flight with the cupola.	Jared Isaacman; Sian Proctor; Hayley Arceneaux; Christopher Sembroski	Success
Crew-3	C210‑1 Endurance	November 11, 2021; May 6, 2022; 176d 2h 39m	LC-39A	Gulf of Mexico	ISS		Raja Chari; Thomas Marshburn; Kayla Barron; Matthias Maurer	Success
Axiom-1 (patch)	C206‑3 Endeavour	April 8, 2022; April 25, 2022; 17d 1h 49m	LC-39A	Atlantic Ocean	ISS	First fully private flight to the ISS. Contracted by Axiom Space. Axiom employee served as commander with three tourists.	Michael López-Alegría (Note: Axiom Space employee); Larry Connor; Eytan Stibbe; Mark Pathy	Success
Crew-4	C212‑1 Freedom	April 27, 2022; October 14, 2022; 170d 13h 2m	LC-39A	Atlantic Ocean	ISS		Kjell Lindgren; Bob Hines; Samantha Cristoforetti; Jessica Watkins	Success
Crew-5	C210‑2 Endurance	October 5, 2022; March 12, 2023; 157d 10h 1m	LC-39A	Gulf of Mexico	ISS	First crew to include a Russian cosmonaut as part of Dragon–Soyuz seat swap program.	Nicole Aunapu Mann; Josh Cassada; Koichi Wakata; Anna Kikina	Success
Crew-6	C206‑4 Endeavour	March 2, 2023; September 4, 2023; 185d 22h 43m	LC-39A	Atlantic Ocean	ISS		Stephen Bowen; Warren Hoburg; Sultan Al Neyadi; Andrey Fedyaev	Success
Axiom-2 (patch)	C212‑2 Freedom	May 21, 2023; May 31, 2023; 9d 5h 27m	LC-39A	Gulf of Mexico	ISS	Fully private flight to the ISS. Contracted by Axiom Space. Axiom employee served as commander, other seats purchased by SSA and a tourist.	Peggy Whitson; John Shoffner; Ali AlQarni; Rayyanah Barnawi	Success
Crew-7	C210‑3 Endurance	August 26, 2023; March 12, 2024; 199d 2h 20m	LC-39A	Gulf of Mexico	ISS		Jasmin Moghbeli; Andreas Mogensen; Satoshi Furukawa; Konstantin Borisov	Success
Axiom-3 (patch)	C212‑3 Freedom	January 18, 2024; February 9, 2024; 21d 15h 40m	LC-39A	Atlantic Ocean	ISS	Fully private flight to the ISS. Axiom employee served as commander, other seats purchased by AM, TUA, and SNSA/ESA.	Michael López-Alegría; Walter Villadei; Alper Gezeravcı; Marcus Wandt	Success
Crew-8	C206‑5 Endeavour	March 4, 2024; October 25, 2024; 235d 3h 35m	LC-39A	Gulf of Mexico	ISS	ISS stay extended and two makeshift seats added to allow Crew-8 to serve as "lifeboat" for the Boeing CFT crew if needed.	Matthew Dominick; Michael Barratt; Jeanette Epps; Alexander Grebenkin	Success
Polaris Dawn (patch)	C207‑3 Resilience	September 10, 2024; September 15, 2024; 4d 22h 13m	LC-39A	Gulf of Mexico	Low Earth orbit	Fully private orbital flight, including two SpaceX employees. First of three planned flights of the private Polaris Program. Flew 1,400 km (870 mi) away from Earth, the highest orbit of the planet flown by a crewed spacecraft since the end of the Apollo program. Isaacman and Gillis made the first commercial spacewalk during the mission.	Jared Isaacman; Scott Poteet; Sarah Gillis (Note: SpaceX employee); Anna Menon	Success
Crew-9	C212‑4 Freedom	September 28, 2024; March 18, 2025; 171d 4h 39m	SLC-40	Gulf of Mexico	ISS	Was the first crewed mission to launch from SLC-40. Launched with only two crew members and returned with the crew of the Boeing Crew Flight Test due to issues with the Boeing Starliner Calypso.	Nick Hague; Aleksandr Gorbunov; Barry E. Wilmore (landing); Sunita Williams (landing)	Success
Crew-10	C210‑4 Endurance	March 14, 2025; August 9, 2025; 147d 16h 29m	LC-39A	Pacific Ocean	ISS		Anne McClain; Nichole Ayers; Takuya Onishi; Kirill Peskov	Success
Fram2 (patch)	C207‑4 Resilience	April 1, 2025; April 4, 2025; 3d 14h 32m	LC-39A	Pacific Ocean	Polar orbit	Fully private, all-civilian orbital flight. First crewed mission to launch into an orbit over the planet's poles. First crewed Dragon landing on the West Coast.	Chun Wang; Jannicke Mikkelsen; Rabea Rogge; Eric Philips	Success
Axiom-4 (patch)	C213‑1; Grace	June 25, 2025; July 15, 2025; 20d 2h 59m	LC-39A	Pacific Ocean	ISS	Fully private flight to the ISS. Axiom employee served as commander; other seats purchased by ISRO, POLSA/ESA, and Hungary.	Peggy Whitson; Shubhanshu Shukla; Sławosz Uznański-Wiśniewski; Tibor Kapu	Success
Crew-11	C206‑6 Endeavour	August 1, 2025; January 15, 2026; 166d 16h 57m	LC-39A	Pacific Ocean	ISS	Final Crew Dragon launch from LC-39A. Mission returned a month earlier than planned due to an undisclosed medical condition of a crew member.	Zena Cardman; Michael Fincke; Kimiya Yui; Oleg Platonov	Success
Crew-12	C212‑5 Freedom	February 13, 2026; October 8, 2026; 237d 5h 18m	SLC-40	Pacific Ocean	ISS	Longest Crew Dragon mission.	Jessica Meir; Jack Hathaway; Sophie Adenot; Andrey Fedyaev	Success
Crew-13	C213‑2; Grace	October 1, 2026; 51d 8h 44m (Note: in progress)	SLC-40	Pacific Ocean (planned)	ISS	Fastest Crew Dragon rendezvous to date at 7 hours and 55 minutes.	Jessica Watkins; Luke Delaney; Joshua Kutryk; Sergey Teteryatnikov	In progress
Axiom-5 (patch)	TBA	January 2027	SLC-40	Pacific Ocean (planned)	ISS	Fully private flight to the ISS. Axiom employee will serve as commander; other seats purchased	TBA	Planned
Crew-14	TBA	March 1, 2027	SLC-40	Pacific Ocean (planned)	ISS		Kayla Barron; Christina Birch; Makoto Suwa; Harutyun Kiviryan	Planned
Crew-15	TBA	TBA	SLC-40	Pacific Ocean (planned)	ISS		TBA	Planned
Crew-16	TBA	TBA	SLC-40	Pacific Ocean (planned)	ISS		TBA	Planned
Crew-17	TBA	TBA	SLC-40	Pacific Ocean (planned)	ISS		TBA	Planned
Vast-PAM-1	TBA	July 2027	SLC-40	Pacific Ocean (planned)	ISS	First private flight to the ISS for Vast.	Thomas Pesquet; Aleš Svoboda; Adrianos Golemis; TBA	Planned
Vast-1	TBA	2027	SLC-40	Pacific Ocean (planned)	Haven-1	Private flight to Vast's Haven-1 space station.	TBA; Arnaud Prost	Planned
VOYG-1	TBA	2028	SLC-40	Pacific Ocean (planned)	ISS	First private flight to the ISS for Voyager.	TBA	Planned
EPIC	TBA	2028	SLC-40	Pacific Ocean (planned)	ISS	First private flight to the ISS for European Space Agency.	TBA	Planned

=== Cargo Dragon flights ===
Mission and Patch	Capsule	Launch date	Landing date	Remarks	Outcome
CRS-21	C208‑1	December 6, 2020	January 14, 2021	First SpaceX mission performed under the CRS-2 contract with NASA and the first flight of Cargo Dragon 2. Also delivered the Nanoracks Bishop Airlock module.	Success
CRS-22	C209‑1	June 3, 2021	July 10, 2021	Also delivered solar arrays iROSA 1 and iROSA 2.	Success
CRS-23	C208‑2	August 29, 2021	October 1, 2021		Success
CRS-24	C209‑2	December 21, 2021	January 24, 2022		Success
CRS-25	C208‑3	July 15, 2022	August 20, 2022		Success
CRS-26	C211‑1	November 26, 2022	January 11, 2023	Also delivered solar arrays iROSA 3 and iROSA 4.	Success
CRS-27	C209‑3	March 15, 2023	April 15, 2023		Success
CRS-28	C208‑4	June 5, 2023	June 30, 2023	Also delivered solar arrays iROSA 5 and iROSA 6. With this mission, Dragon 2 fleet's 1,324 days in orbit surpassed the Space Shuttle. This was the 38th Dragon mission to ISS, surpassing the shuttle's 37.	Success
CRS-29	C211‑2	November 10, 2023	December 22, 2023		Success
CRS-30	C209‑4	March 21, 2024	April 30, 2024	First Dragon 2 launch from SLC-40.	Success
CRS-31	C208‑5	November 5, 2024	December 16, 2024	First Dragon to perform a reboost of the ISS.	Success
CRS-32	C209‑5	April 21, 2025	May 25, 2025	First Cargo Dragon to splash down in the Pacific Ocean.	Success
CRS-33	C211‑3	August 24, 2025	February 27, 2026	Equipped with a "boost kit" capable of performing multiple re-boosts of the ISS. Longest Cargo Dragon mission to date.	Success
CRS-34	C209‑6	May 15, 2026	June 17, 2026		Success
CRS-35	C211‑4	October 13, 2026	November 21, 2026		Success
United States Deorbit Vehicle	TBA	2030		To deorbit the ISS after it is decommissioned.	Planned

=== Timeline ===
Crew Dragon has flown 15 missions for NASA under its CCDev and CCP programs and 7 privately funded crewed missions. Cargo Dragon has flown 15 cargo missions for NASA. For brevity, the Demo-1 mission is not shown.

== See also ==
- Comparison of crewed space vehicles
- Comparison of space station cargo vehicles
- List of crewed spacecraft
- Crew Dragon Launch Abort System
- Private spaceflight – Spaceflight not by a government
