= Cargo Dragon C208 =

Uncrewed cargo capsule built by SpaceX

C208
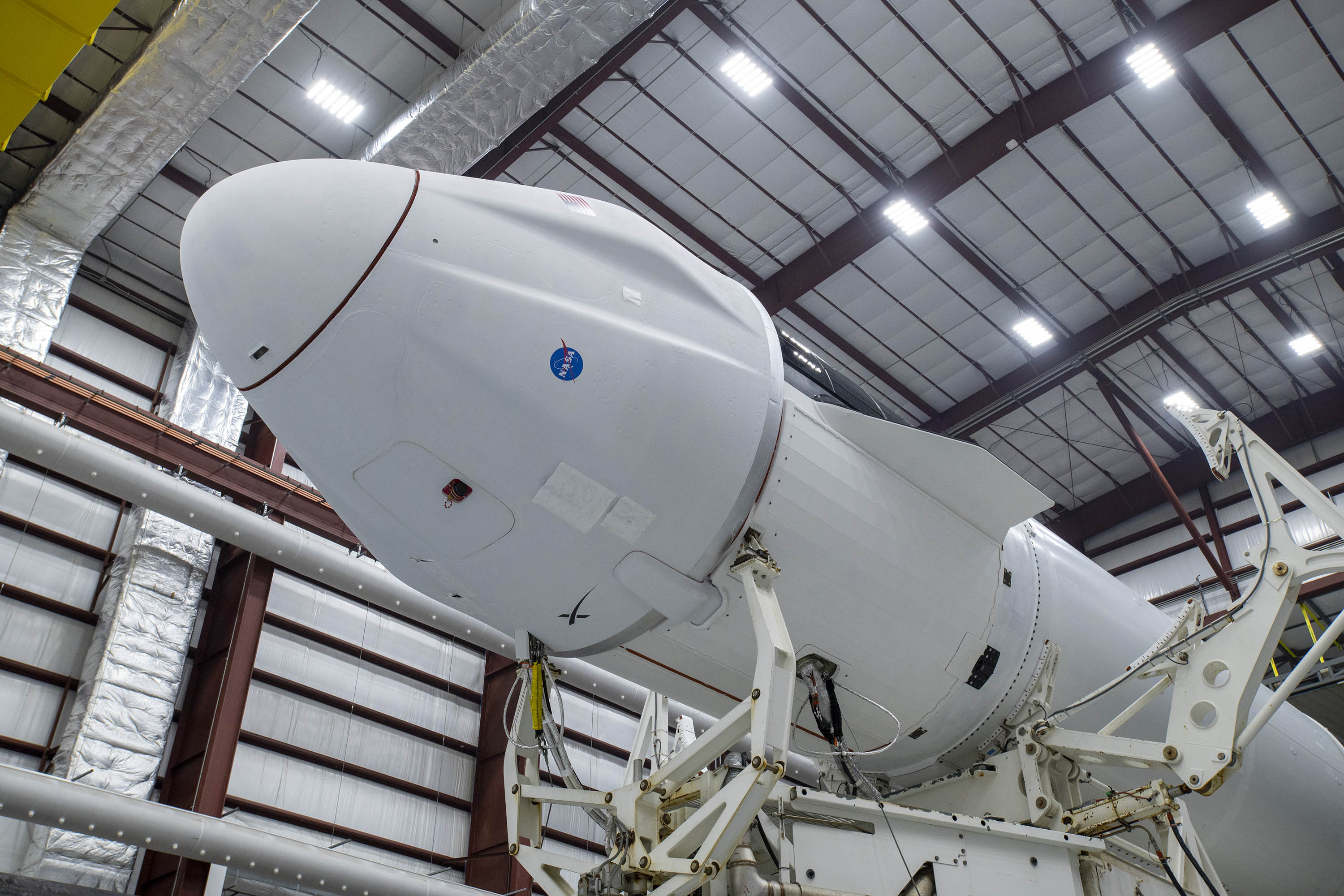
- C208 at Kennedy in August 2021.
- Type: Space capsule
- Class: Dragon 2
- Owner: SpaceX
- Manufacturer: SpaceX

Specifications
- Dimensions: 4.4 m × 3.7 m (14 ft × 12 ft)
- Power: Solar panel
- Rocket: Falcon 9 Block 5

History
- Location: Hawthorne, California
- First flight: 6 December 2020 – 14 January 2021; SpaceX CRS-21
- Last flight: 5 November 2024 – 17 December 2024; SpaceX CRS-31
- Flights: 5
- Flight time: 175 days, 13 hours and 52 minutes

Dragon 2s

Dragon C208 is the first Cargo Dragon 2 spacecraft, and the first in a line of International Space Station resupply craft which replaced the Dragon capsule, manufactured by SpaceX. The mission is contracted by NASA under the Commercial Resupply Services (CRS) program. It flew for the first time on the CRS-21 mission on 6 December 2020. This was the first flight for SpaceX under NASA's CRS Phase 2 contract awarded in January 2016. This was also the first time a Cargo Dragon was docked at the same time as a Crew Dragon spacecraft (SpaceX Crew-1). This mission used Booster B1058.4.

== Cargo Dragon ==
C208 is the first SpaceX Dragon 2 cargo variant. C208 and the other Cargo Dragons are different from the crewed variant by launching without seats, cockpit controls, astronaut life support systems, or SuperDraco abort engines. The Cargo Dragon improves on many aspects of the original Dragon design, including the recovery and refurbishment process.

The new Cargo Dragon capsules splashes down under parachutes in the Atlantic Ocean east of Florida or in the Gulf of Mexico, rather than the previous recovery zone in the Pacific Ocean west of Baja California. This NASA preference was added to all CRS-2 awards to allow for cargo to be more quickly returned to the Kennedy Space Center after splashdown.

== Flights ==
Mission	Patch	Launch date (UTC)	Duration	Landing date (UTC)	Notes	Outcome
CRS-21		6 December 2020, 16:17:08	38 days	14 January 2021, 01:26	First time Dragon 2 was used for a CRS mission, first launch of phase 2 of CRS missions, first time a Cargo Dragon and Crew Dragon docked to the ISS at the same time.	Success
CRS-23		29 August 2021, 07:14:49	32 days	1 October 2021	Third time Dragon 2 was used for a CRS mission, third launch of phase 2 of CRS missions	Success
CRS-25		15 July 2022, 00:44 UTC	36 days	20 August 2022	Fifth time Dragon 2 was used for a CRS mission, fifth launch of phase 2 of CRS missions	Success
CRS-28		5 June 2023, 15:47 UTC	24 days	30 June 2023	Eighth time Dragon 2 was used for a CRS mission, eighth launch of phase 2 of CRS missions	Success
CRS-31		5 November 2024, 02:29 UTC	42 days	17 December 2024	Eleventh time Dragon 2 was used for a CRS mission, eighth launch of phase 2 of CRS missions	Success

== See also ==
- SpaceX Crew-1
- Boeing CST-100 Starliner
- Crew Dragon C201
- Cargo Dragon C209
- Cargo Dragon C211
