= SpaceX CRS-25 =

2022 American resupply spaceflight to the ISS

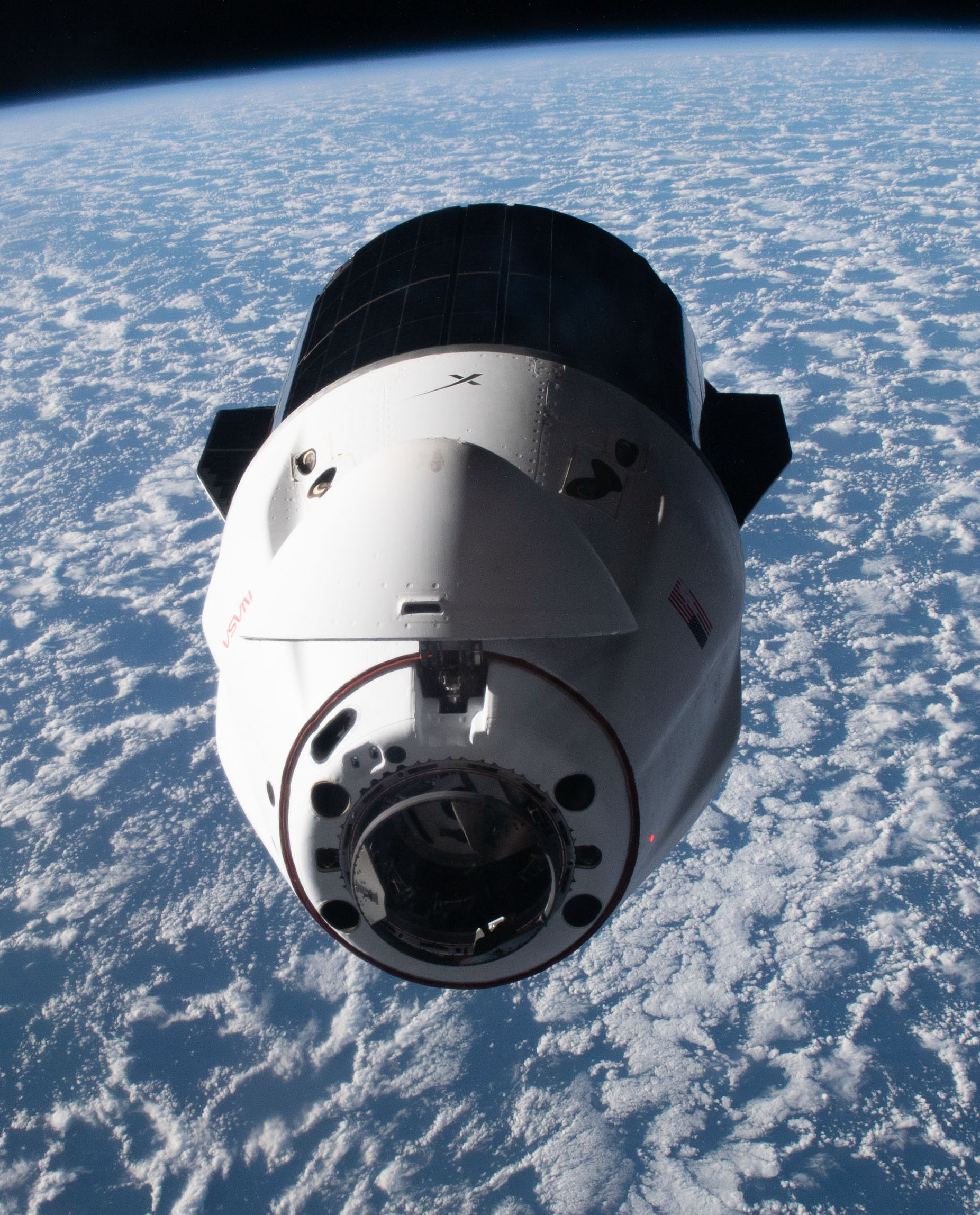
- CRS-25 mission approaching the ISS
- Names: SpX-25
- Mission type: ISS resupply
- Operator: SpaceX
- COSPAR ID: 2022-081A
- SATCAT no.: 53113
- Mission duration: 36 days, 18 hours, 9 minutes

Spacecraft properties
- Spacecraft: Cargo Dragon C208
- Spacecraft type: Cargo Dragon
- Bus: SpaceX Dragon 2
- Manufacturer: SpaceX
- Launch mass: 6,000kg (13,000 lb)
- Dry mass: 9,525 kg (20,999 lb)

Start of mission
- Launch date: 15 July 2022, 00:44:22 UTC
- Rocket: Falcon 9 Block 5 B1067-5
- Launch site: Kennedy Space Center, LC-39A

End of mission
- Recovered by: MV Megan
- Landing date: 20 August 2022, 18:53 UTC
- Landing site: Atlantic Ocean

Orbital parameters
- Reference system: Geocentric orbit
- Regime: Low Earth orbit
- Inclination: 51.66°

Docking with ISS
- Docking port: Harmony forward
- Docking date: 16 July 2022, 15:21 UTC
- Undocking date: 19 August 2022, 15:05 UTC
- Time docked: 33 days, 23 hours, 44 minutes
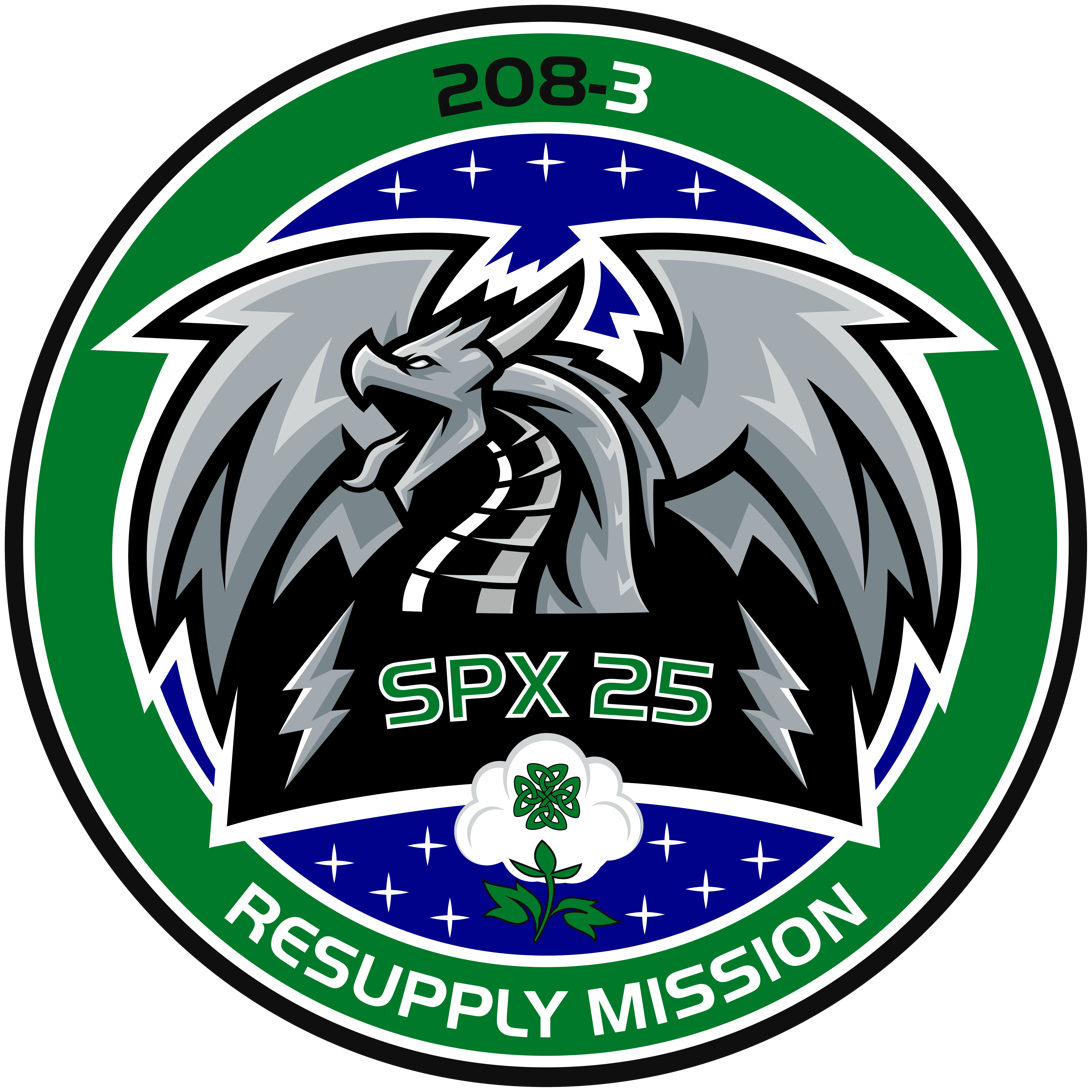
- SpaceX CRS-25 mission patch Commercial Resupply Services Cargo Dragon flights

SpaceX CRS-25, also known as SpX-25, was a Commercial Resupply Service mission (CRS) to the International Space Station (ISS) that was launched on 15 July 2022. The mission was contracted by NASA and was flown by SpaceX using their reusable spacecraft, the Cargo Dragon. The vehicle delivered supplies to the crew aboard the ISS along with multiple pieces of equipment that will be used to conduct multiple research investigations aboard the ISS.

The launch of CRS-25 was delayed to July 11 to investigate issues in the Dragon's propulsion system detected during pre-launch testing. The previously scheduled launch date was June 10.

== Mission overview ==
=== Objective ===
SpX-25 was a Commercial Resupply Service mission to the International Space Station (ISS). This flight was the 25th resupply flight of cargo sent to the International Space Station.

=== Timeline ===
SpX-25 was launched on July 15, 2022 (0:44 Universal Time) on a SpaceX Falcon 9 rocket from the Kennedy Space Center in Florida. Dragon arrived at ISS on July 16, 2022. The SpX-25 mission lasted 36 days, 18 hours and 9 minutes, coming down off the Florida coast on August 20, 2022.

==== Delay ====
According to NASA, elevated levels of monomethyl hydrazine (MMH) vapor were detected in the spacecraft's propulsion system, causing the launch mission to be delayed for repairs. The entire affected area of the spacecraft was removed and investigated before proceeding with the launch.

== Cargo Dragon ==
The Cargo Dragon is a cargo spacecraft designed by SpaceX, and it is currently the only spacecraft capable of not only sending cargo into space but also returning cargo back to Earth. It utilizes the Falcon 9 rocket as its launch vehicle which detaches from the Dragon once it reaches orbit. The Cargo Dragon launched with 5,800 lb (2,600 kg) of crew supplies, tools, and scientific equipment to support NASA and ISS research.

=== Re-usability ===
This is the third flight of the particular Cargo Dragon unit to space and SpaceX's 25th commercial resupply mission. The Falcon 9 was used to launch SpX-25 into space and is also partially reusable. Various parts of the Falcon 9 are recoverable and relaunched for future supply missions. The Cargo Dragon spacecraft itself is preserved by the parachute-assisted splashdown technique allowing boats to retrieve and reuse parts. Recycling parts of Cargo Dragon and Falcon 9 significantly minimizes the cost to launch crafts into space and optimizes resources for future missions.

==== Cargo details ====
SpX-25 hauled $118 million worth of resources and about 4,000 lb (1,800 kg) of supplies.

== Research contributions ==
Four significant studies on board SpX-25 were delivered and researched at the ISS:

=== Earth's dust patterns ===
As part of the SpX-25 resupply mission, NASA's Jet Propulsion Laboratory (JPL) developed Earth Surface Mineral Dust Source Investigation (EMIT) in order to track the mineral composition of dust on the arid regions of Earth. Dust can have a cooling effect or heating effect depending on its mineral composition. EMIT is a 1-year investigation that will collect images to track and generate maps of dust patterns and provide insight into the local, regional, or global effects of dust as it travels through the atmosphere.

=== Immune system aging ===
Immunosenescence is the dysfunction and change of the immune system of the elderly and it occurs as a natural part of the aging process. This process is linked to a higher propensity to infection, a higher risk of autoimmune disorders, and an increased risk of malignancies such as cancer. The ISS is conducting research on how microgravity in space might negatively affect these processes to better understand immune system aging and develop treatments to protect astronauts from the possible of microgravity. Additionally, microgravity provides a medium to study immune system aging at an accelerated rate, making it a helpful tool to study immune system aging and find applications on Earth.

=== CubeSats ===
CubeSats are a category of research spacecraft called nano-satellites. A CubeSat allows small satellite cargo to fly on rockets headed to space. CubeSats involve small experiments that can be small and inexpensive to build and launch. Their compact functionality broadens accessibility to spacial research and technology development to students, universities, and other related initiatives.

=== Genes in space ===
This is one of many experiment launches sent to the ISS on board SpX-25. This study will observe the process of cell-free protein production in microgravity. This study is conducted without the use of living cells and is carried out by using biosensors to detect particular target molecules present in the cell. The success of this study would create low-resource, portable, and low-cost technology for medical applications.

=== European Space Agency (ESA) research and activities ===
ESA's BIOFILMS (Biofilm Inhibition On Flight equipment and on board the ISS using microbiologically Lethal Metal Surfaces) experiment investigating bacterial biofilm formation and antimicrobial properties of different metal surfaces under spaceflight conditions in altered gravity

== Gallery ==
SpaceX CRS-25
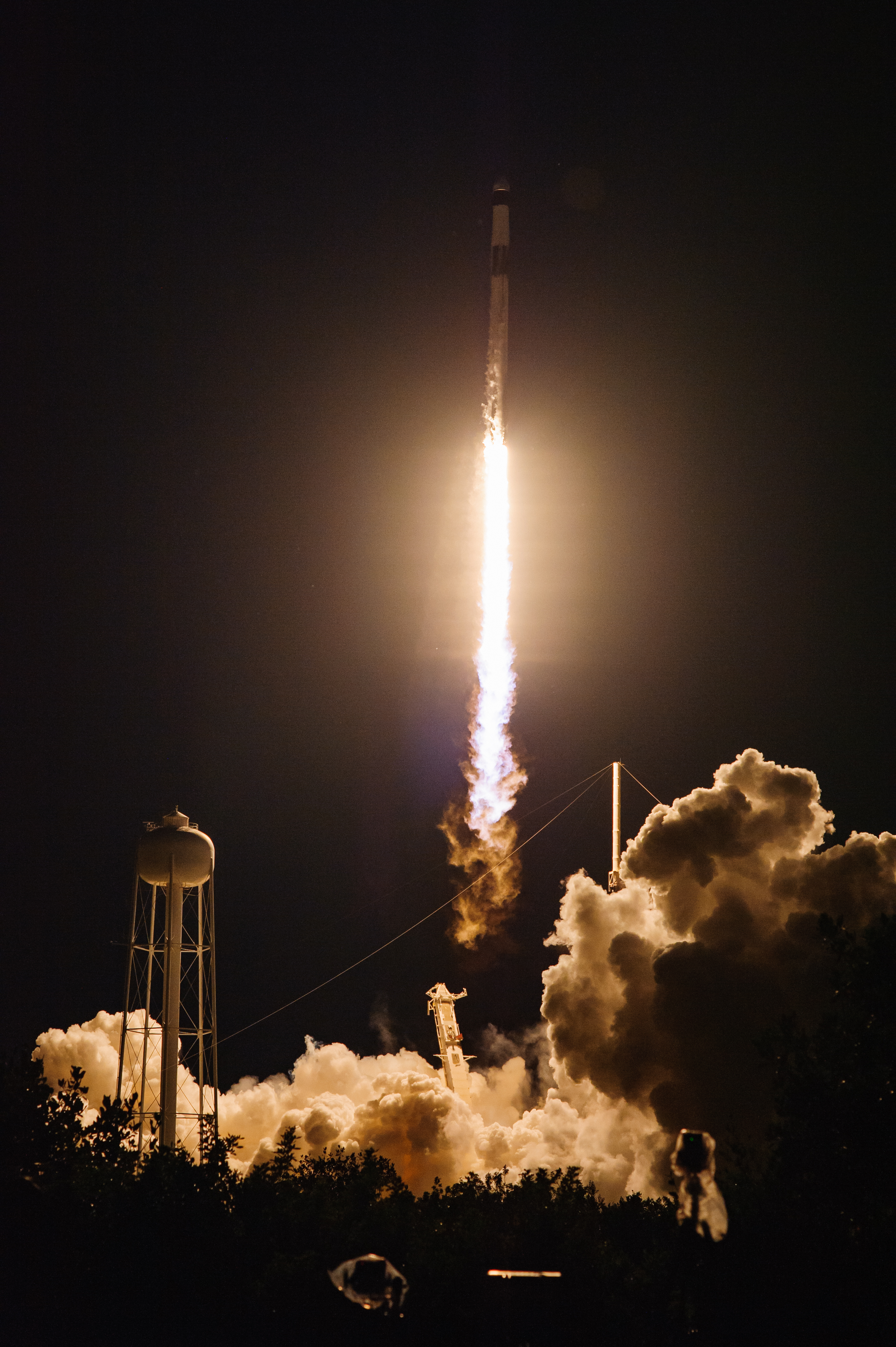
Launch of CRS-25

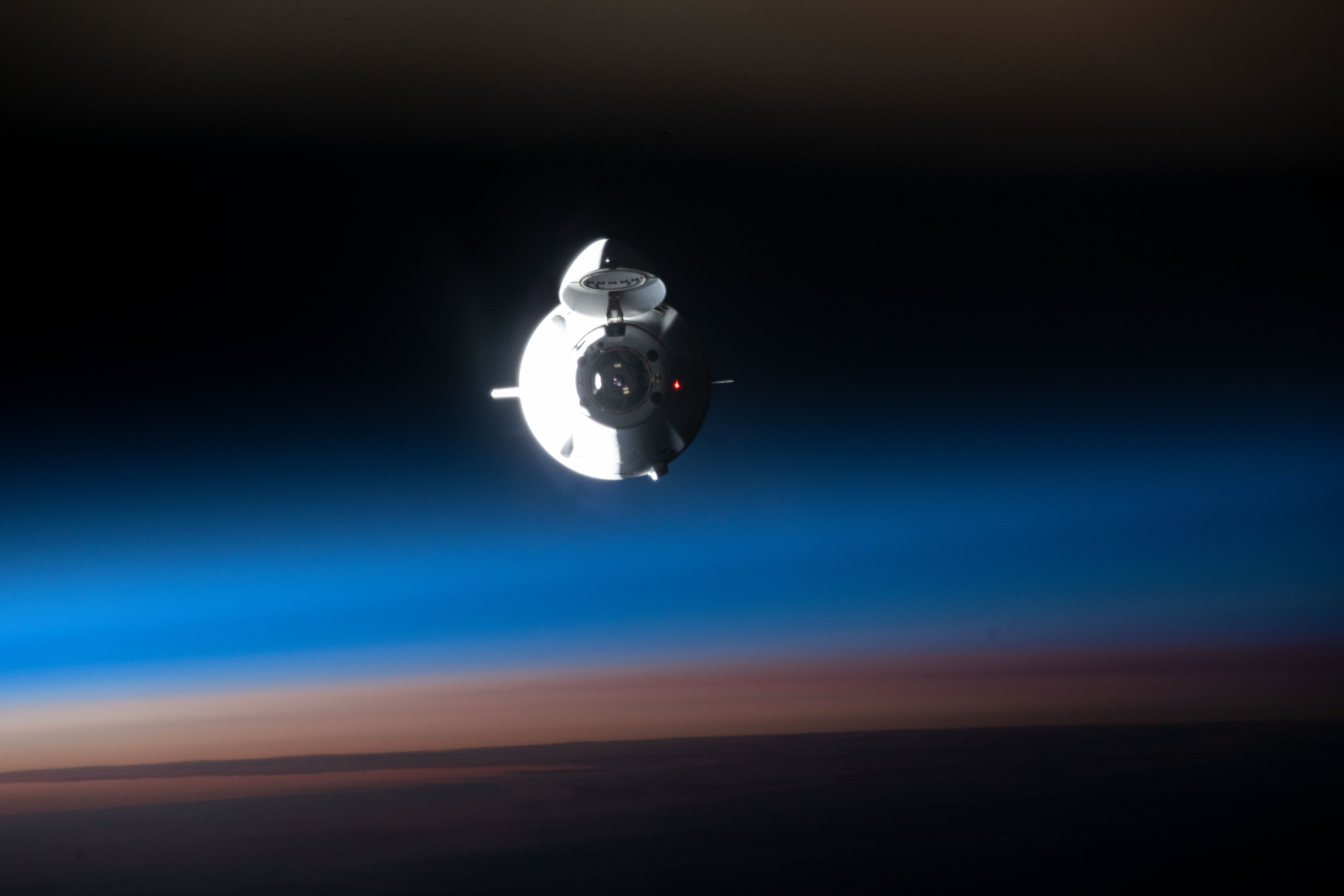
Cargo Dragon approaching the ISS

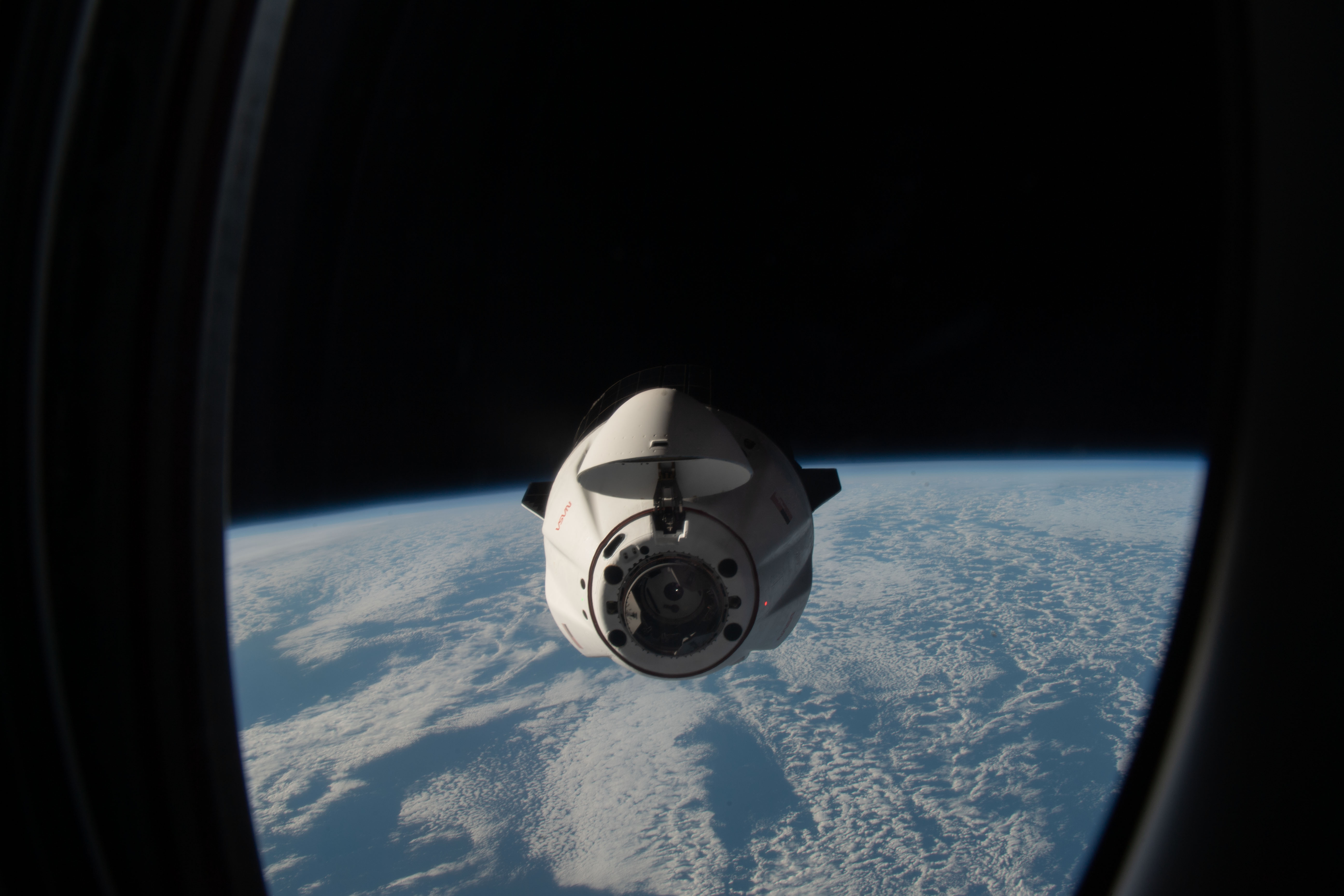
Cargo Dragon nears the ISS

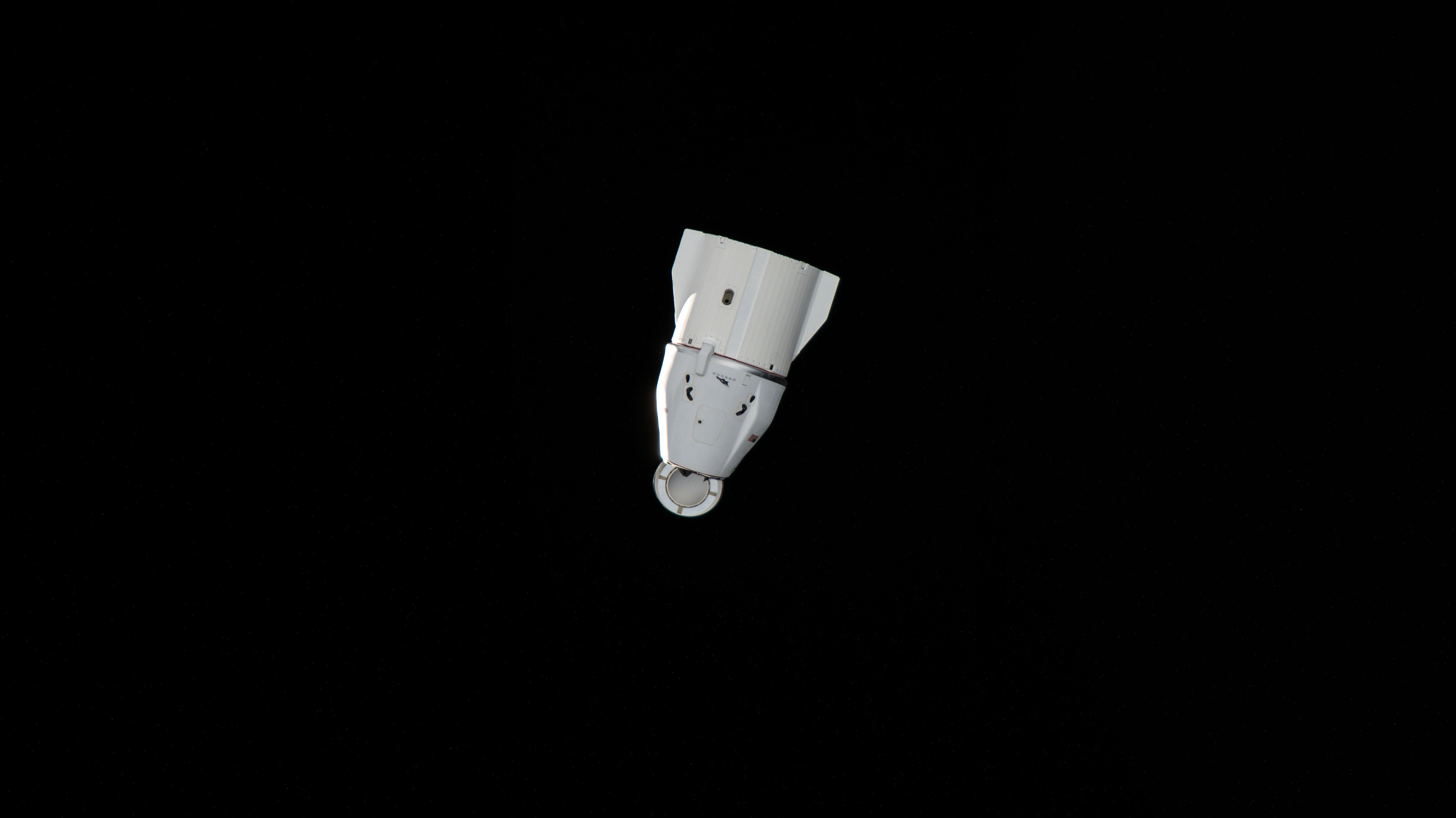
Cargo Dragon departing the ISS
