= Shannon (2009 ship) =

SpaceX Dragon Recovery Vessel

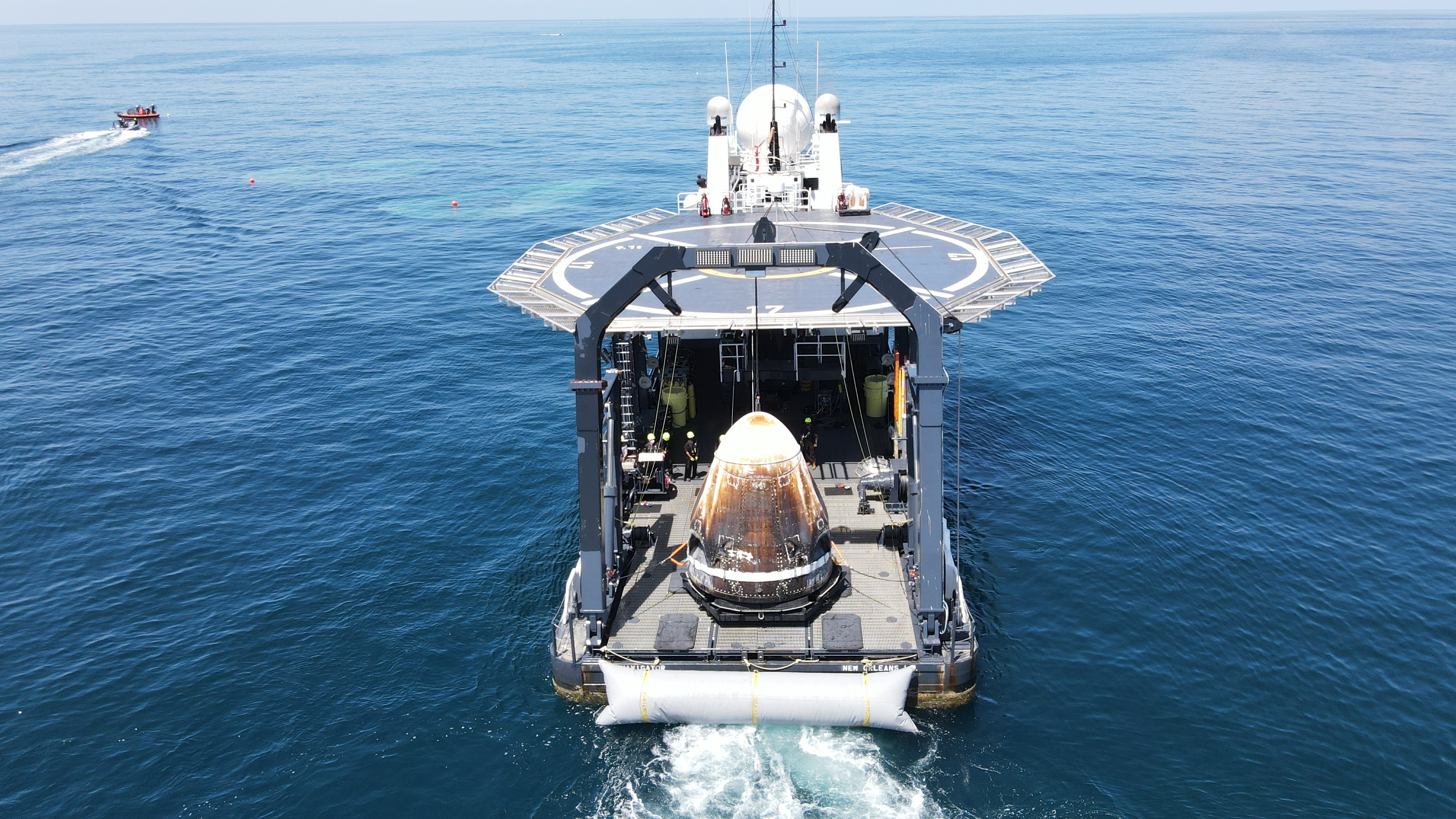
- The SpaceX Crew Dragon Endeavour, with NASA astronauts Robert Behnken and Douglas Hurley inside, is seen aboard SpaceX’s Shannon recovery ship shortly after splashing down in the Gulf of Mexico off the coast of Pensacola, Florida, on August 2, 2020.

History

United States
- Name: Shannon (2022–present); GO Navigator (2018–2022); GIS Grizzly (2014–2018); Harvey Grizzly (2013–2014); Callais Navigator (2009–2013)
- Namesake: Shannon Walker
- Owner: Falcon Landing, LLC (2022–present); Guice Offshore (2013–2022)
- Operator: SpaceX (2018–present); Guice Offshore (2013–2018)
- Port of registry: Port of Long Beach, California (2025–present); Port Canaveral, Florida (2018–2024)
- Builder: Master Boat Builders, Coden, Alabama
- Launched: 2009
- Completed: 2010
- In service: 2010
- Identification: Call sign: WDK3552; IMO number: 9566887; MMSI number: 367550000
- Status: In service

General characteristics
- Class & type: Platform supply vessel
- Tonnage: 498 GT; 659 DWT
- Length: 49.85 m (163 ft 7 in)
- Beam: 11 m (36 ft)
- Draught: 3 m (9 ft 10 in)
- Depth: 3.7 m (12 ft)
- Decks: 1
- Installed power: 1,750 hp (1,300 kW)
- Propulsion: 2 × Caterpillar 3508B
- Speed: 22 kn (41 km/h; 25 mph)
- Capacity: 20
- Crew: 6

MV Shannon, formerly known as MV GO Navigator, is one of SpaceX's Dragon capsule recovery vessels. Owned by SpaceX through Falcon Landing LLC (which also owns SpaceX's fairing recovery vessels and Elon Musk's private jet), this vessel, along with her sister ship, MV Megan, is designed to retrieve Crew and Cargo Dragon capsules after splashdown.

When a Dragon capsule is preparing to return to Earth, Shannon or Megan are dispatched to wait near the predetermined landing zone. After splashdown, fast boats deploy from the vessel, approach the capsule to perform safety checks, check on the crew, and prepare it to be lifted aboard the recovery vessel, where the astronauts can exit the capsule. NASA requires SpaceX to allow the astronauts to exit within 60 minutes of splashdown.

To support its mission, the vessel is equipped with a specialized crane on the stern to pull the capsule up from the water, a medical unit to treat astronauts, and a helipad to allow astronauts and any time-sensitive cargo materials returned from space to be quickly returned to shore.

== History ==
GO Navigator's services were procured by SpaceX as a quick transport vessel, as a back-up to GO Searcher in the event of any technical failures.

In 2018 and 2019, the vessel and its crew were deployed for several hours of training to prepare for the recovery of the Dragon 2 capsules and their astronauts. The vessel executed the recovery operations during the Crew Dragon In-Flight Abort Test.

Between April and May 2019, GO Navigator was temporarily re-assigned to fairing recovery operations for the ArabSat-6A, Starlink 0.9, STP-2, and Amos-17 missions.

The vessel played a key role in the recovery operation of SpaceX's first crewed mission – Crew Dragon Demo-2. along with Megan. Both the vessels are identical and equipped with a medical treatment facility, helipad, lifting frame, etc.

GO stands for Guice Offshore, the owner and operator of these types of vessels.

In early 2022, the vessel was renamed Shannon after SpaceX Crew-1 astronaut Shannon Walker, along with GO Searcher being renamed Megan after SpaceX Crew-2 astronaut Megan McArthur. They are registered to Falcon Landing LLC, a SpaceX-linked company that also owns recovery ships Bob and Doug and Elon's private jet.

The Vessel is being moved to the West Coast of the United States in December 2024 to support the Crew Dragon splashdown in the Pacific Ocean, due to the capsule's trunk falling into a populated area. It will go through the port of Long Beach in California, the same location that the droneship Of Course I Still Love You has been since 2021, which was moved to the California coast to support Vandenderg launches and landings.

== List of recovery missions ==
Date	Mission	Role
April 11, 2019	ArabSat-6A	Fairing recovery support
May 24, 2019	Starlink	Fairing recovery support
June 25, 2019	STP-2	Fairing recovery support
August 6, 2019	Amos-17	Fairing recovery support
November 11, 2019	Starlink-2	Fairing recovery support
August 2, 2020	Demo-2	Crew Dragon recovery
January 14, 2021	CRS-21	Cargo Dragon recovery
March 11, 2021	Starlink 20	Fairing recovery support
March 14, 2021	Starlink 21	Fairing recovery support
May 2, 2021	Crew-1	Crew Dragon recovery
May 26, 2021	Starlink 28	Fairing recovery support
June 6, 2021	SXM-8	Fairing recovery support
July 10, 2021	CRS-22	Cargo Dragon recovery
November 8, 2021	Crew-2	Crew Dragon recovery
May 6, 2022	Crew-3	Crew Dragon recovery
March 12, 2023	Crew-5	Crew Dragon recovery
April 15, 2023	CRS-27	Cargo Dragon recovery
June 30, 2023	CRS-28	Cargo Dragon recovery
December 22, 2023	CRS-29	Cargo Dragon recovery
February 9, 2024	Axiom-3	Crew Dragon recovery
April 30, 2024	CRS-30	Cargo Dragon recovery
September 15, 2024	Polaris Dawn	Crew Dragon recovery
April 4, 2025	Fram2	Crew Dragon recovery
May 25, 2025	CRS-32	Cargo Dragon recovery
July 15, 2025	Axiom-4	Crew Dragon recovery
August 9, 2025	Crew-10	Crew Dragon recovery
January 15, 2026	Crew-11	Crew Dragon recovery
February 27, 2026	CRS-33	Cargo Dragon recovery
June 17, 2026	CRS-34	Cargo Dragon recovery
October 8, 2026	Crew-12	Crew Dragon recovery
November 21, 2026	CRS-35	Cargo Dragon recovery

== Mission overview ==
=== Demo-2 ===
For the Crew Dragon Demo-2 mission, the GO Navigator had a broken backup generator; however it still completed its mission and recovered the Endeavour capsule from the sea. The recovery was impeded by private boats which circled the capsule in the water.

GO Navigator Demo-2 recovery mission
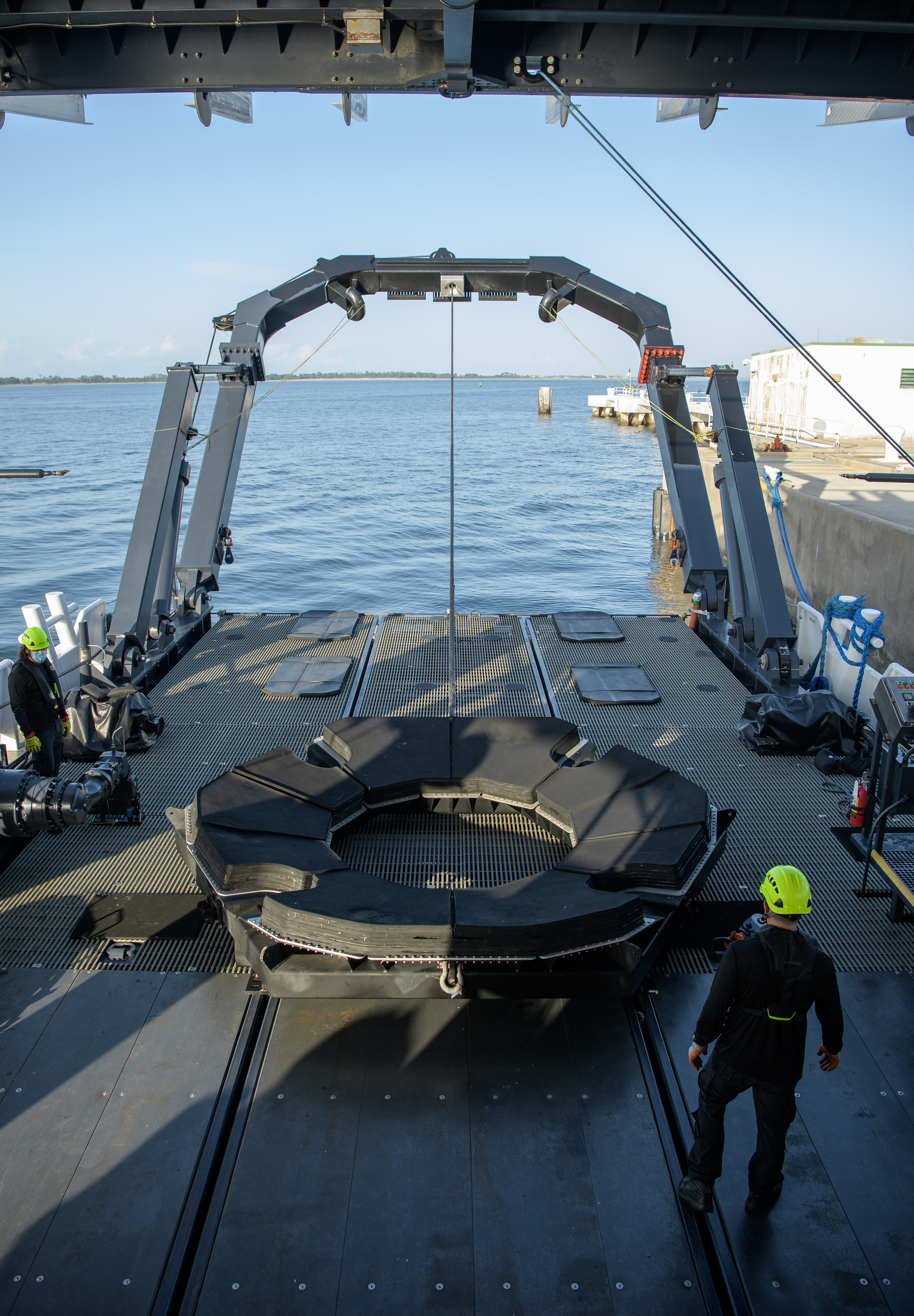
GO Navigator in the dock showing capsule "nest" and retractable arch recovery device.

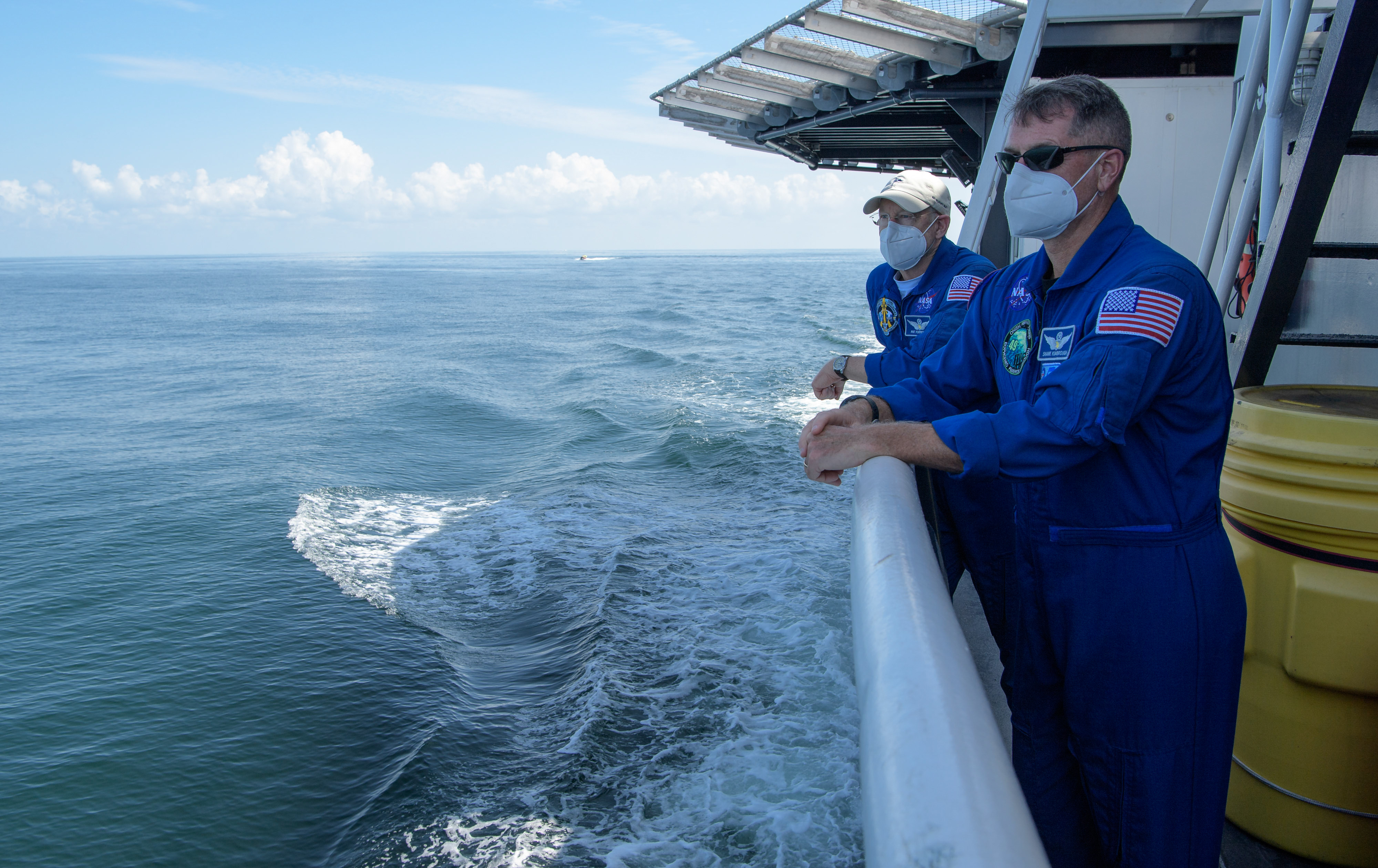
NASA Chief Astronaut Patrick G. Forrester, left, and NASA astronaut and Crew Recovery Chief Shane Kimbrough.

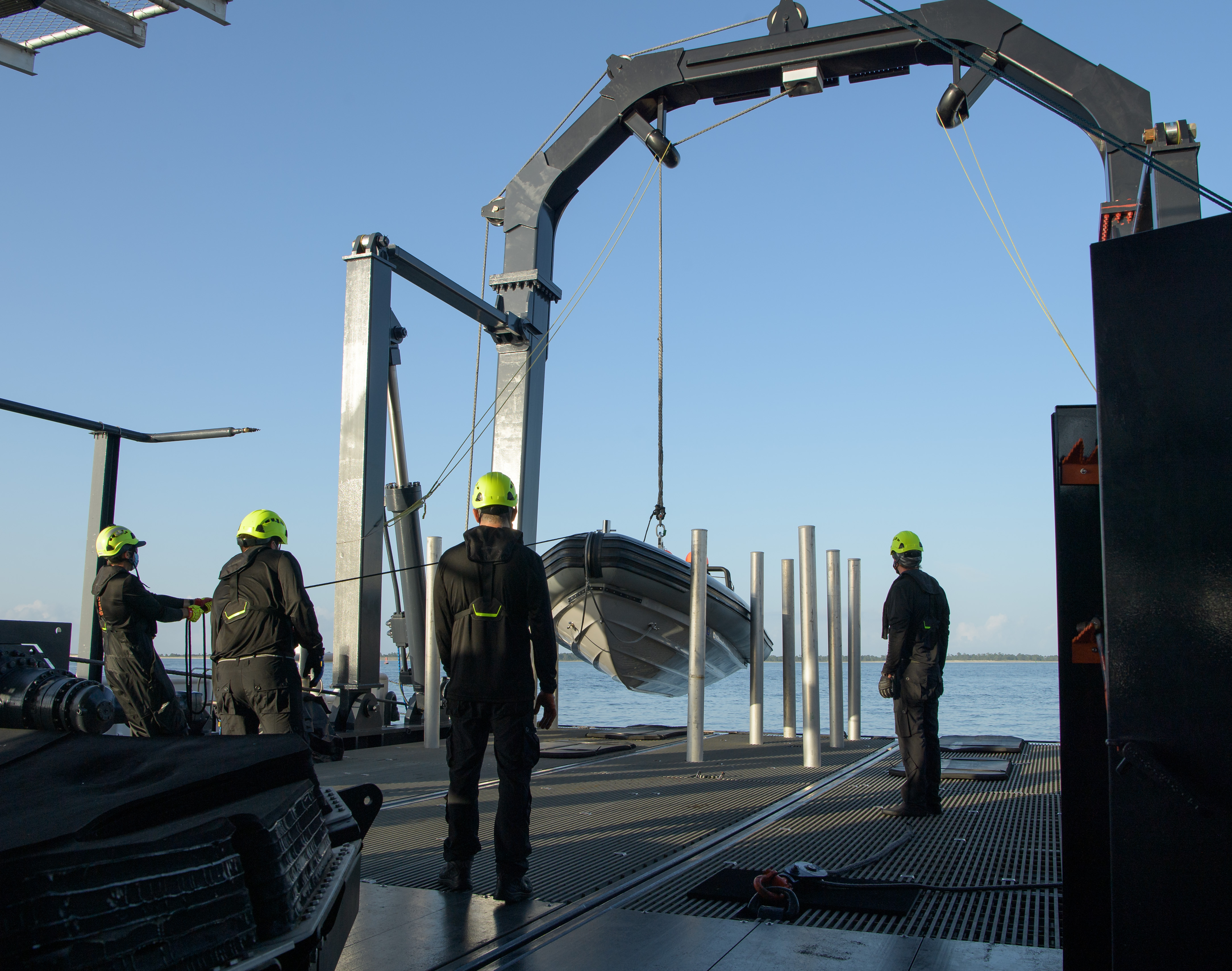
GO Navigator deploying a fast boat off the rear of the boat.

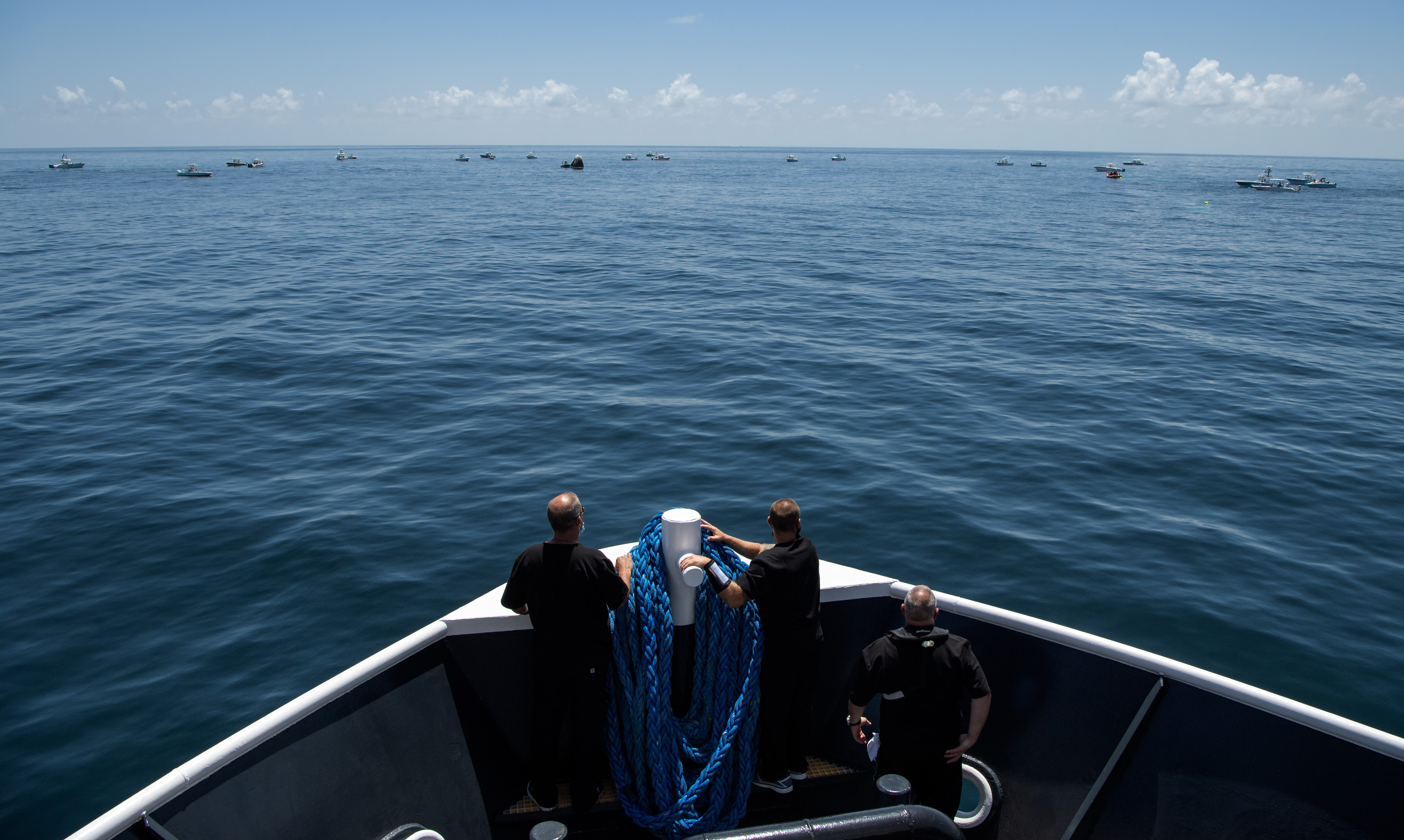
GO Navigator approaches the capsule.

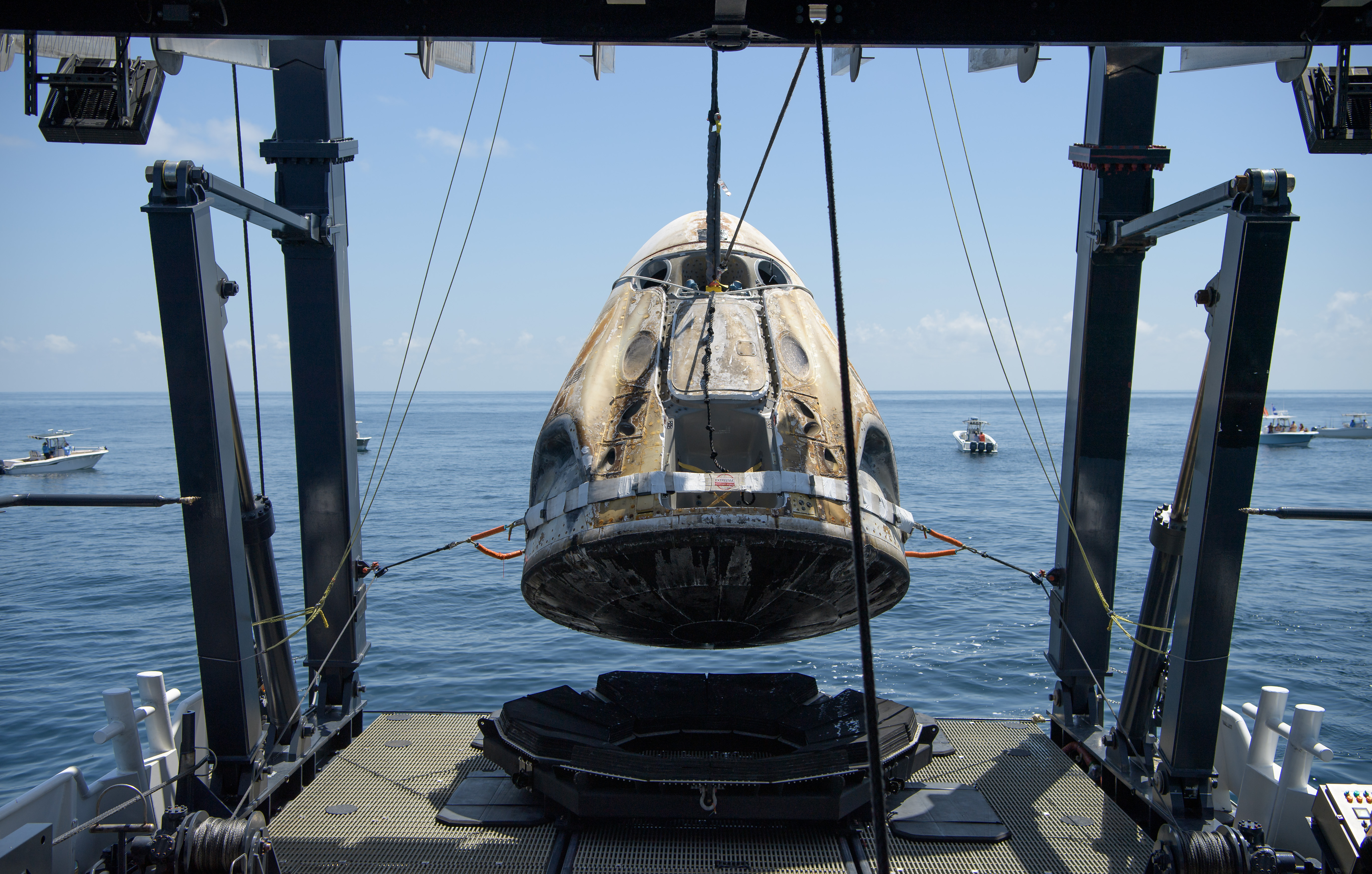
Crew Dragon Endeavour being hoisted onto aft of GO Navigator vessel.

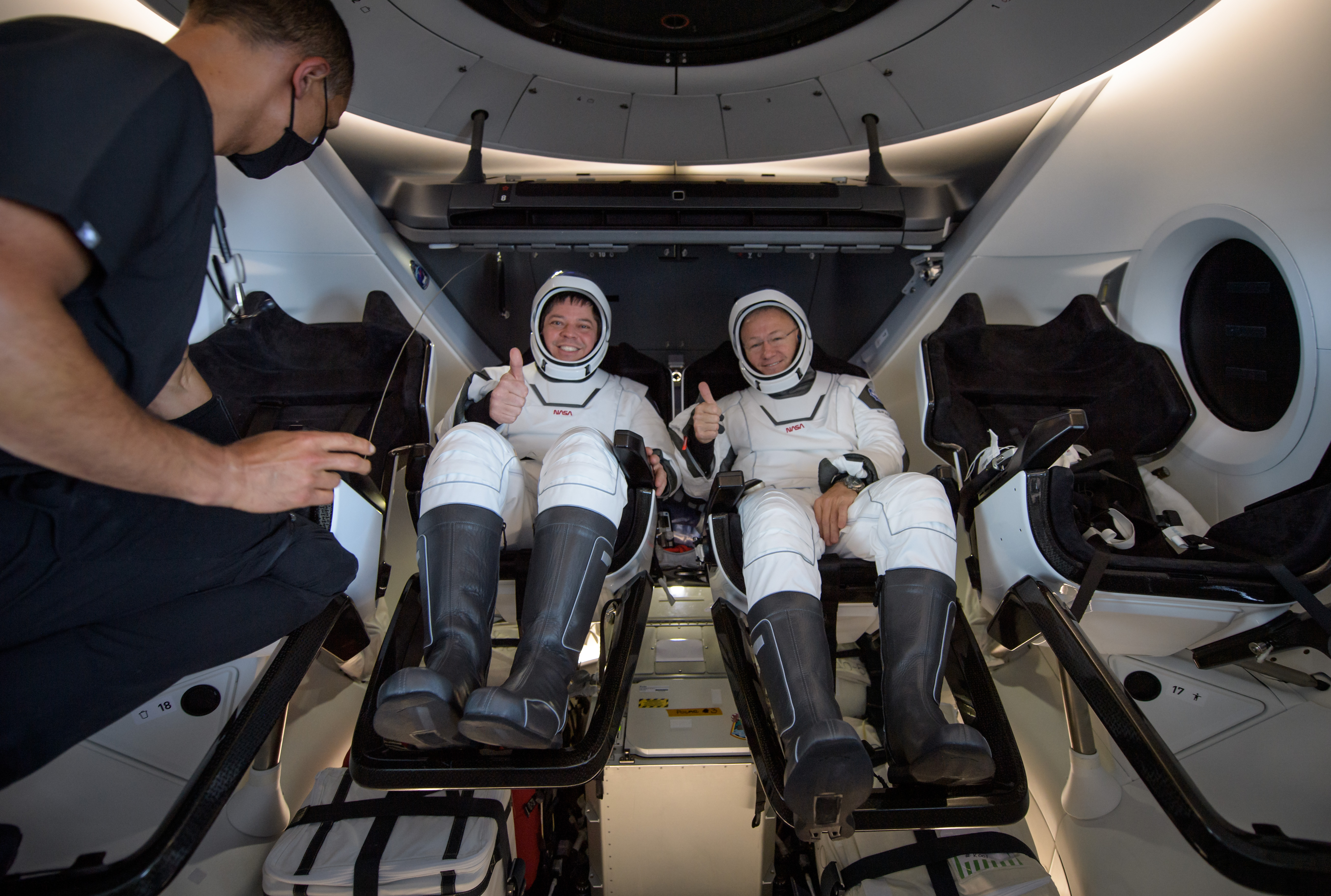
Robert Behnken, left, and Douglas Hurley are seen inside Endeavour onboard GO Navigator being greeted by SpaceX flight surgeon Anil Menon.
more images can be found on wiki commons.

== See also ==
- Megan, another SpaceX Dragon recovery ship
