= SpaceX CRS-30 =

2024 American resupply spaceflight to the ISS

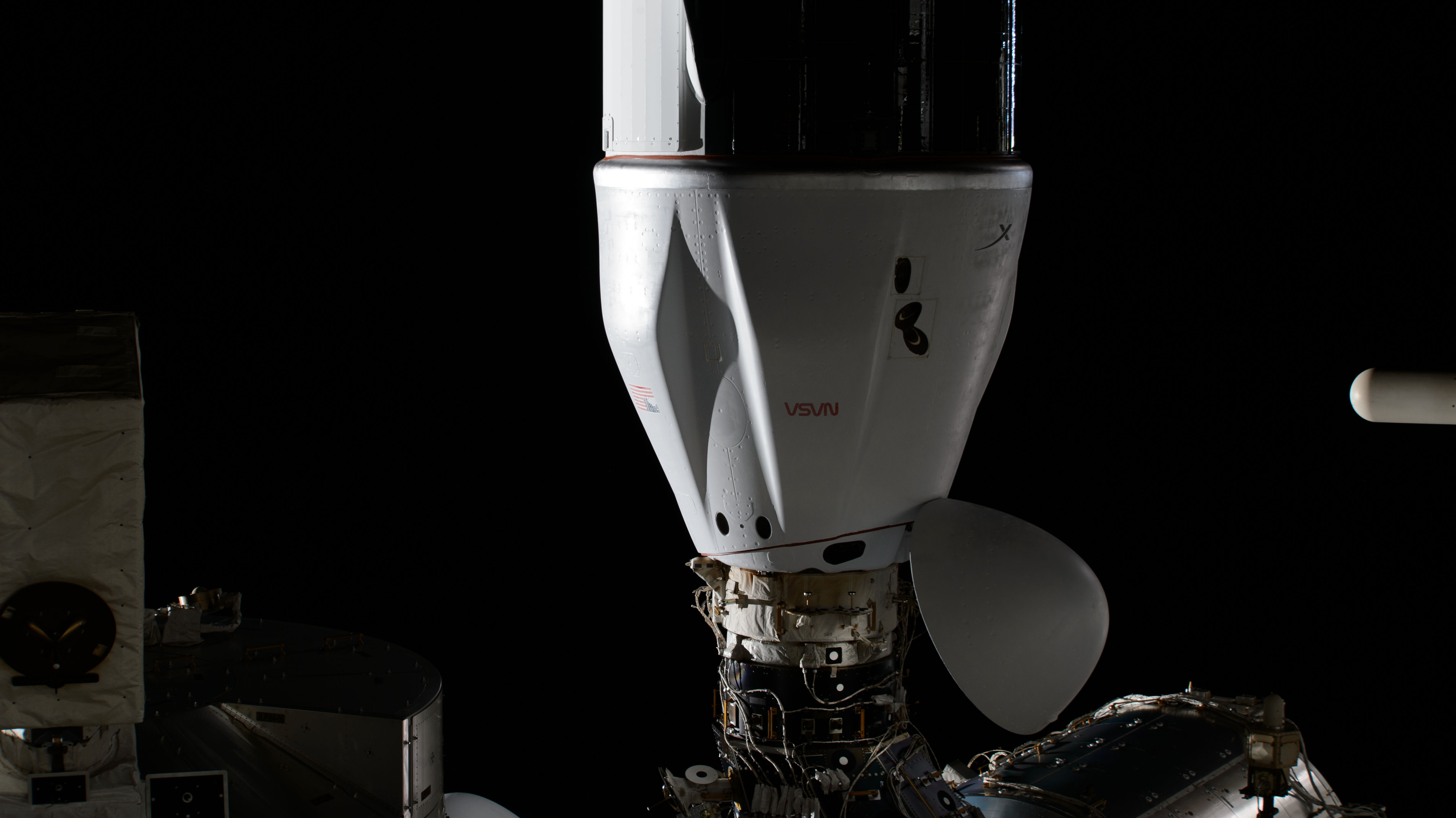
- CRS-30 docked to the ISS
- Names: SpX-30
- Mission type: ISS resupply
- Operator: SpaceX
- COSPAR ID: 2024-054A
- SATCAT no.: 59287
- Mission duration: 39 days, 8 hours, 43 minutes

Spacecraft properties
- Spacecraft: Cargo Dragon C209
- Spacecraft type: Cargo Dragon
- Manufacturer: SpaceX

Start of mission
- Launch date: 21 March 2024, 20:55 UTC (4:55 am EDT)
- Rocket: Falcon 9 Block 5 B1080-6
- Launch site: Cape Canaveral, SLC‑40

End of mission
- Recovered by: MV Shannon
- Landing date: 30 April 2024, 05:38 UTC (1:38 am EDT)
- Landing site: Gulf of Mexico

Orbital parameters
- Reference system: Geocentric orbit
- Regime: Low Earth orbit
- Inclination: 51.66°

Docking with ISS
- Docking port: Harmony zenith
- Docking date: 23 March 2024, 11:19 UTC
- Undocking date: 28 April 2024, 17:10 UTC
- Time docked: 36 days, 5 hours, 51 minutes

Cargo
- Mass: 2,841 kg (6,263 lb)
- Pressurised: 2,210 kg (4,870 lb)
- Unpressurised: 631 kg (1,391 lb)
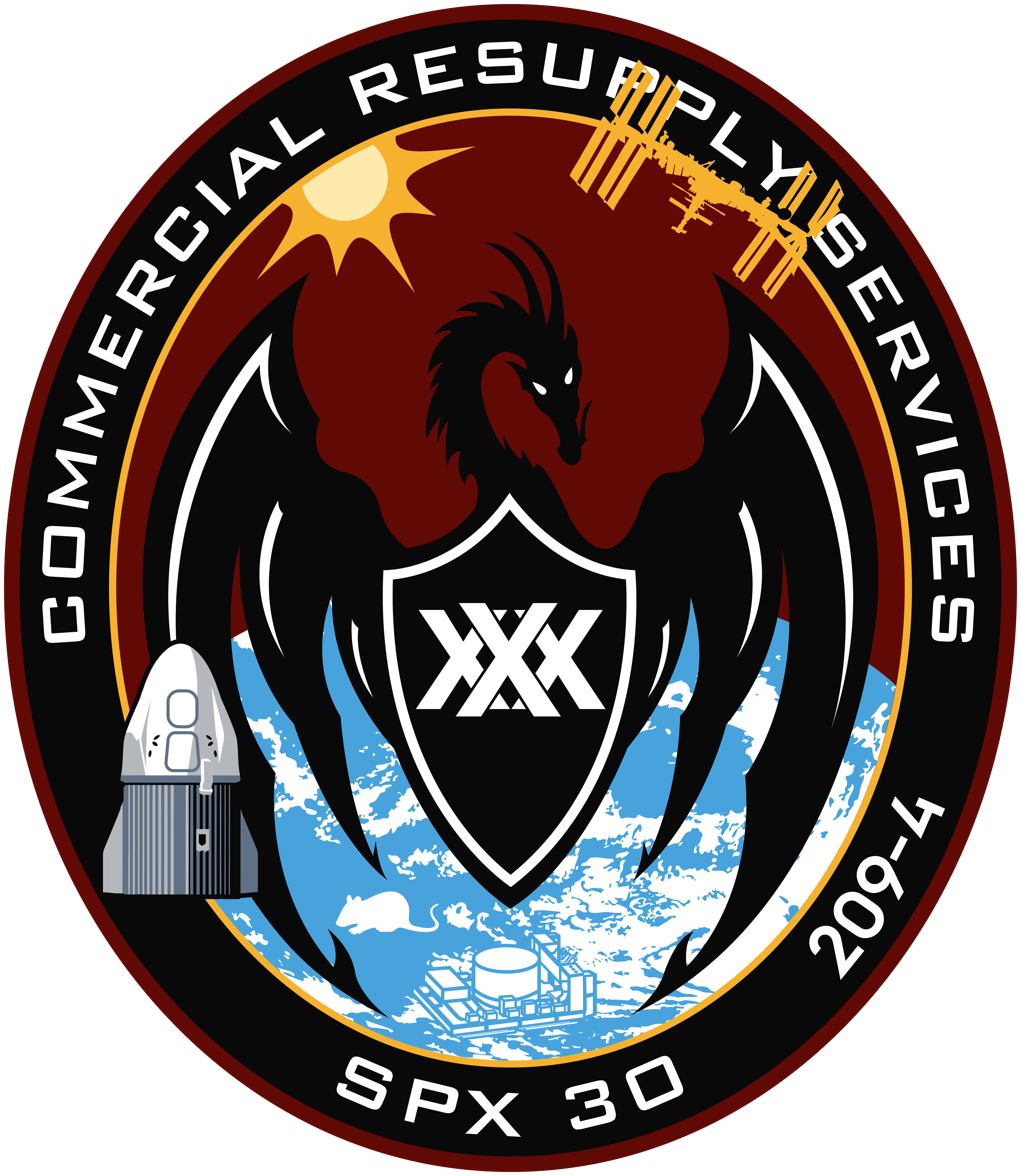
- Mission patch Commercial Resupply Services Cargo Dragon flights

SpaceX CRS-30, sometimes identified by NASA as SpX-30, was an American cargo spacecraft flight to the International Space Station (ISS), that launched on 21 March 2024. It was operated by SpaceX under a Commercial Resupply Services (CRS) contract with NASA. The spacecraft is a Cargo Dragon, serial number C209, which made its fourth flight on this mission. This mission was the first Cargo Dragon to launch from Cape Canaveral Space Launch Complex 40 since the second generation capsule was introduced on the SpaceX CRS-21 mission. In that time, a tower and access arm were added to the pad, allowing late loading of supplies into the spacecraft.

== Cargo Dragon ==
SpaceX plans to reuse the Cargo Dragons up to five times. The Cargo Dragon doesn't require SuperDraco abort engines, seats, cockpit controls, or the life support system required to sustain astronauts in space. Dragon 2 improves on Dragon 1 in several ways, including lessened refurbishment time, leading to shorter periods between flights.

The new Cargo Dragon capsules under the NASA CRS Phase 2 contract land east of Florida in the Atlantic Ocean, so that cargo can be returned more quickly to Cape Canaveral after splashdown.

== Launch ==
Falcon 9 and Cargo Dragon launched at 20:55 UTC on 21 March 2024, for SpaceX's 30th commercial resupply services mission to the International Space Station. Falcon 9's first stage booster B1080 successfully landed at Landing Zone-1 (LZ-1) eight minutes after launch, and Cargo Dragon separated from the 2nd stage 4 minutes later. Dragon autonomously docked to the International Space Station's Harmony module on Saturday, March 23, at 11:19 UTC. It delivered 2,841 kilograms of supplies and a spare pump for the station's external thermal loop system, which was located in Dragon's trunk. CRS-30 was the first to launch with a Dragon spacecraft from Launch Complex 40 at Cape Canaveral, and the first to use the newly-constructed crew and cargo access tower at the pad.

== Manifest ==
The Cargo Dragon spacecraft was loaded with a total of 2,841 kilograms (6,263 lb) of cargo and supplies before its launch, including 2,841 kilograms (6,263 lb) of pressurised and 631 kilograms (1,391 lb) of unpressurised cargo.

The cargo manifest is broken down as follows:

- Crew supplies: 545 kg (1,202 lb)
- Science investigations: 1,135 kg (2,502 lb)
- Spacewalk equipment: 90 kg (200 lb)
- Vehicle hardware: 415 kg (915 lb)
- Computer resources: 25 kg (55 lb)

== Research ==
Various experiments will be transported to the orbiting laboratory, and will provide valuable insight for researchers.

SpaceX’s Dragon will deliver new science investigations, food, supplies, and equipment to the international crew. NASA and partner research flying aboard the CRS-30 mission includes a look at plant metabolism in space and a set of new sensors for free-flying Astrobee robots to provide 3D mapping capabilities. Other studies include a fluid physics study that could benefit nanoparticle solar cell technology and a university project from CSA (Canadian Space Agency) that will monitor sea ice and ocean conditions.

=== SNOOPI ===
Signals of Opportunity P-band Investigation (SNOOPI) is a 6U CubeSat mission led by James Garrison, a professor at Purdue University, aimed at using P-band signals from telecommunications satellites to measure soil moisture and snow water content from space. This project is significant for enhancing agricultural practices, water management, and climate prediction by offering a more accessible method to gather important environmental data. Unlike traditional methods that face challenges with radio frequency spectrum access and require large antennas, SNOOPI uses an innovative approach that captures reflected signals from the Earth's surface to measure moisture and snow depth. This technique, known as P-band signals of opportunity reflectometry, is effective because it can penetrate vegetation and provide accurate data on soil and snow conditions. This mission not only seeks to validate the effectiveness of using P-band signals for environmental measurements but also aims to pave the way for future space missions by providing a cost-effective and efficient solution for global monitoring of soil moisture and snow water equivalent.

=== Plants off the Planet ===
Plants can be used in regenerative life support systems, to provide food, and to contribute to the well-being of astronauts on future deep space exploration missions. C4 Photosynthesis in Space (APEX-09) examines how microgravity affects the mechanisms by which two types of grasses, known as C3 and C4, capture carbon dioxide from the atmosphere. Results could clarify plant responses to stressful environments and inform the design of bio-regenerative life support systems on future missions, as well as systems for plant growth on Earth.

=== Sensing the Sea ===
A technique called Global Navigation Satellite System reflectometry (GNSS-R), which receives satellite signals reflected from the surface of Earth, as a way to monitor ocean phenomena and improve climate models. Killick-1: A GNSS Reflectometry CubeSat for Measuring Sea Ice Thickness and Extent (Nanoracks KILLICK-1) tests using this technique to measure sea ice. The project supports development of space and science capabilities in Newfoundland and Labrador, Canada, by providing hands-on experience with space systems and Earth observation. More than 100 undergraduate and graduate engineering students participated in the project. GNSS-R technology is low-cost, light, and energy efficient. Its potential applications on Earth include providing data for weather and climate models and improving the understanding of ocean phenomena such as surface winds and storm surge.

=== Automated Autonomous Assistance ===
Multi-resolution Scanner (MRS) Payload for the Astrobee (Multi-Resolution Scanning) tests technology to automate 3D sensing, mapping, and situational awareness systems. The technology combines multiple sensors, which compensates for weaknesses in any one of them and provides very high-resolution 3D data and more accurate trajectory data to understand how the robot moves around in space. The technology could be used for autonomous operation of spacecraft with minimal or no human occupancy where robots must sense the environment and precisely maneuver, including the lunar Gateway space station. Other uses could be to inspect and maintain spacecraft and for autonomous vehicle operations on other celestial bodies. Results also support improvements in robotic technologies for harsh and dangerous environments on Earth.

=== Placement of Particles ===
The Nano Particle Haloing Suspension investigation examines how nanoparticles and microparticles interact within an electrical field. A process called nanoparticle haloing uses charged nanoparticles to enable precise particle arrangements that improve the efficiency of quantum-dot synthesized solar cells. Quantum dots are tiny spheres of semiconductor material with the potential to convert sunlight into energy much more efficiently. Conducting these processes in microgravity provides insight into the relationship between shape, charge, concentration, and interaction of particles. The investigation is supported by NASA’s Established Program to Stimulate Competitive Research (EPSCoR), which partners with government, higher education, and industry on projects to improve a research infrastructure and research and development capacity and competitiveness.

== Gallery ==
SpaceX CRS-30
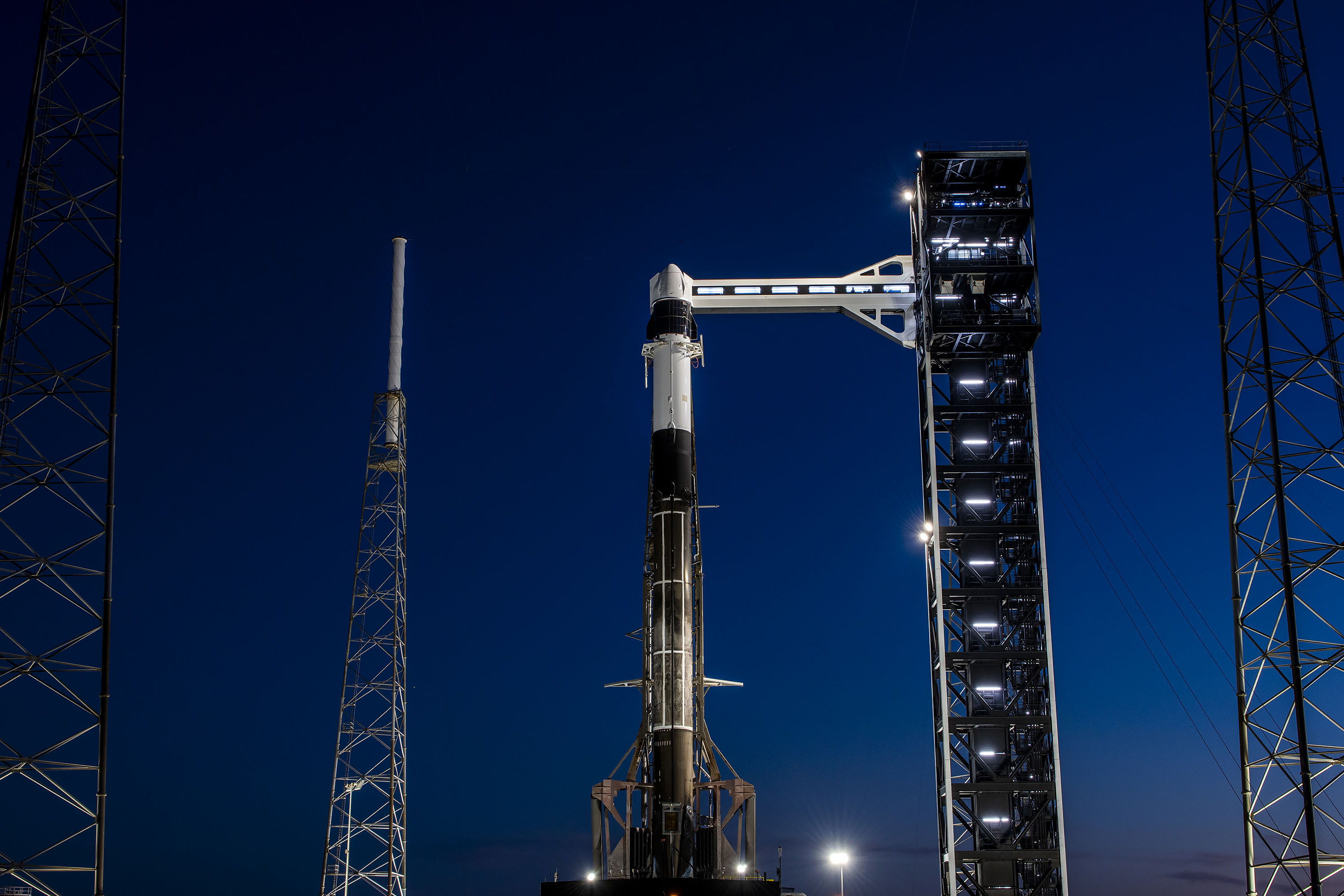
CRS-30 on the pad

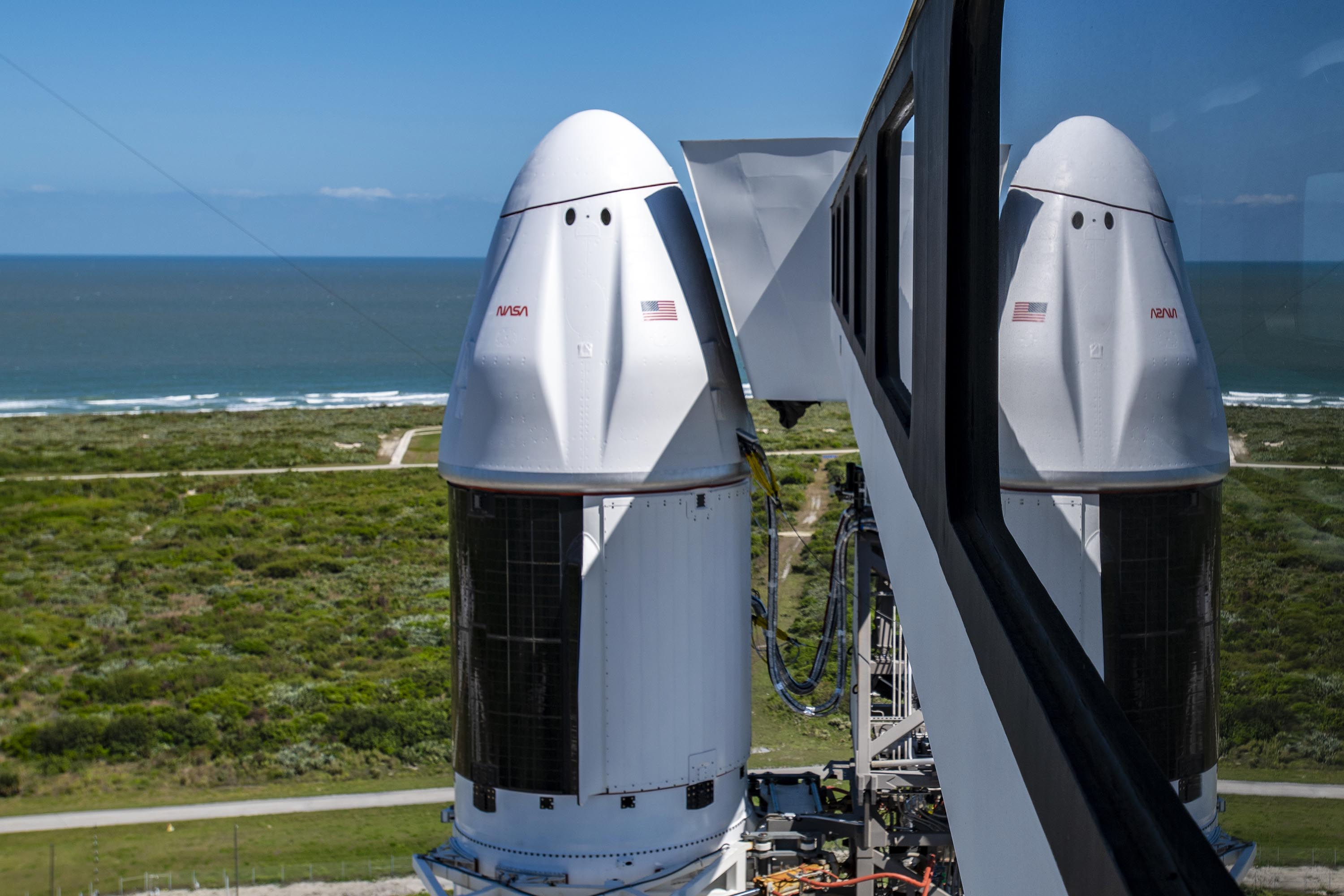
CRS-30 ahead of launch

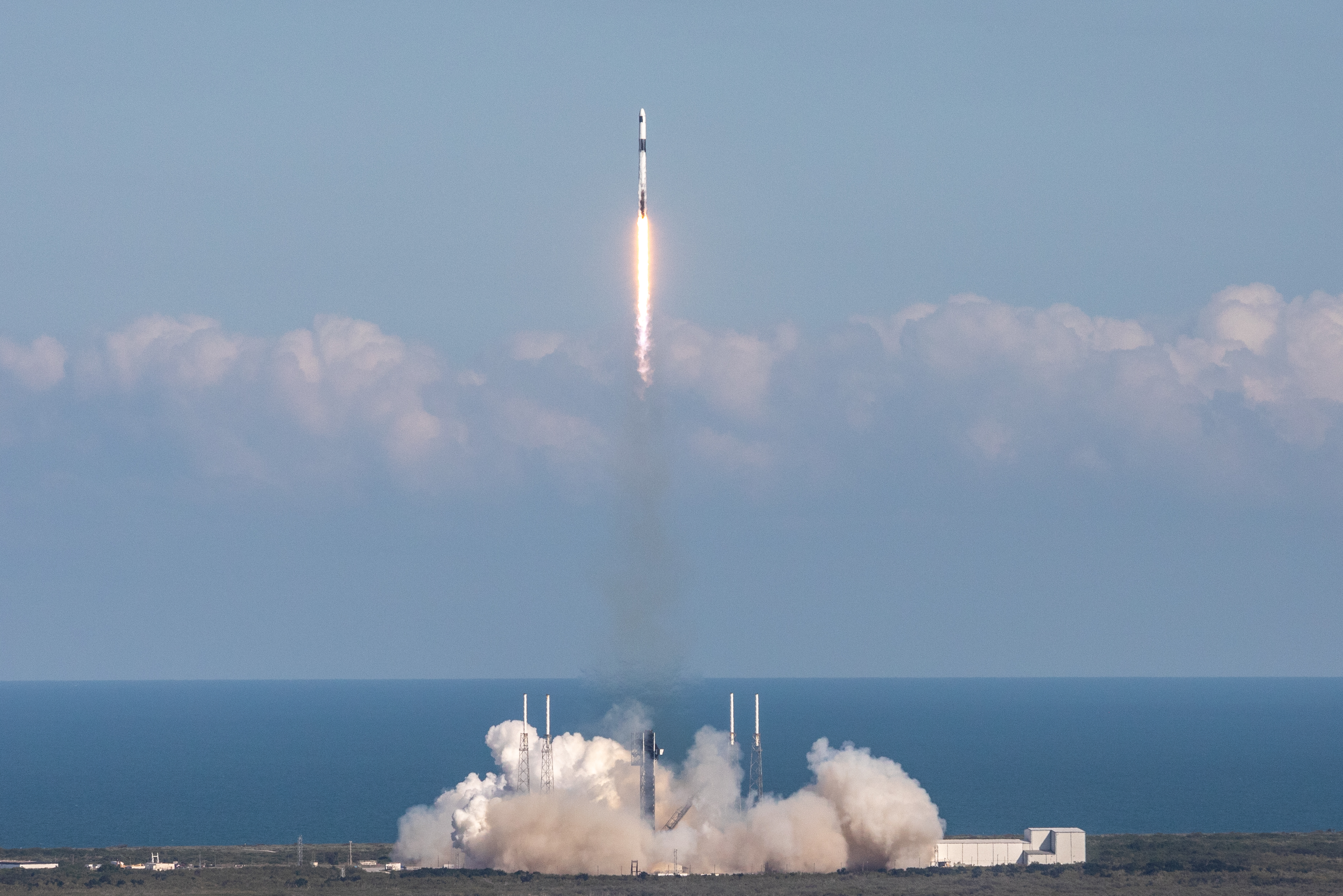
Launch of CRS-30

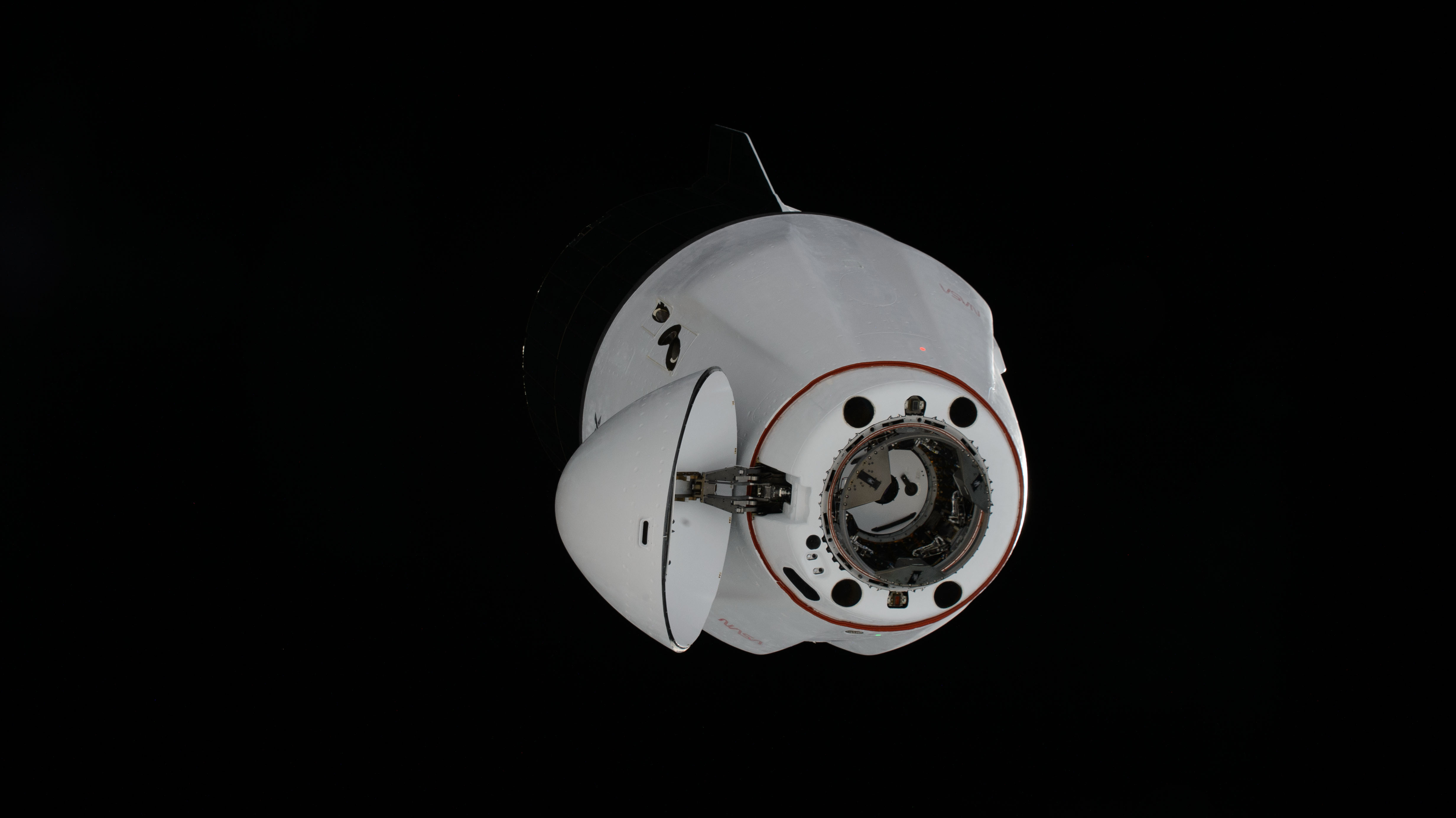
Dragon approaching the ISS

== See also ==
- Uncrewed spaceflights to the International Space Station
