= SpaceX CRS-32 =

2025 cargo resupply mission to the International Space Station

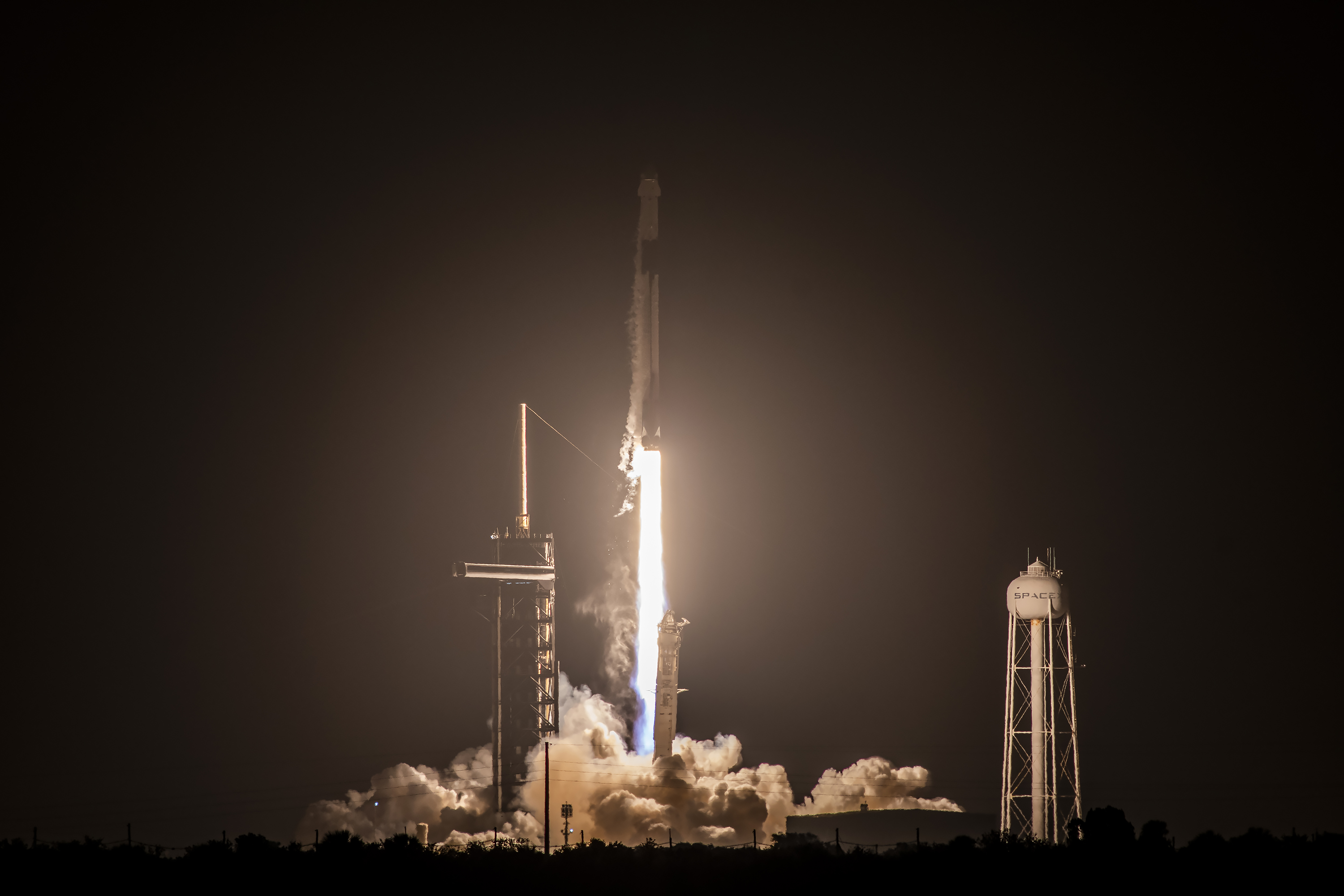
- Falcon 9 rocket carrying Cargo Dragon C209 spacecraft lifts off from LC-39A
- Names: CRS SpX-32
- Mission type: ISS resupply
- Operator: SpaceX
- COSPAR ID: 2025-080A
- SATCAT no.: 63628
- Mission duration: 33 days, 21 hours and 29 minutes

Spacecraft properties
- Spacecraft: Cargo Dragon C209
- Spacecraft type: Cargo Dragon
- Manufacturer: SpaceX

Start of mission
- Launch date: April 21, 2025, 08:15:45 UTC (4:15:45 am EDT)
- Rocket: Falcon 9 Block 5 (B1092‑3), Flight 462
- Launch site: Kennedy, LC‑39A

End of mission
- Recovered by: MV Shannon
- Landing date: May 25, 2025, 05:44 UTC
- Landing site: Pacific Ocean near Oceanside

Orbital parameters
- Reference system: Geocentric orbit
- Regime: Low Earth orbit

Docking with ISS
- Docking port: Harmony zenith
- Docking date: April 22, 2025, 12:40 UTC
- Undocking date: May 23, 2025, 16:05 UTC
- Time docked: 31 days, 3 hours and 25 minutes

Cargo
- Mass: 3,021 kg (6,660 lb)
- Pressurised: 2,168 kg (4,780 lb)
- Unpressurised: 750 kg (1,650 lb)
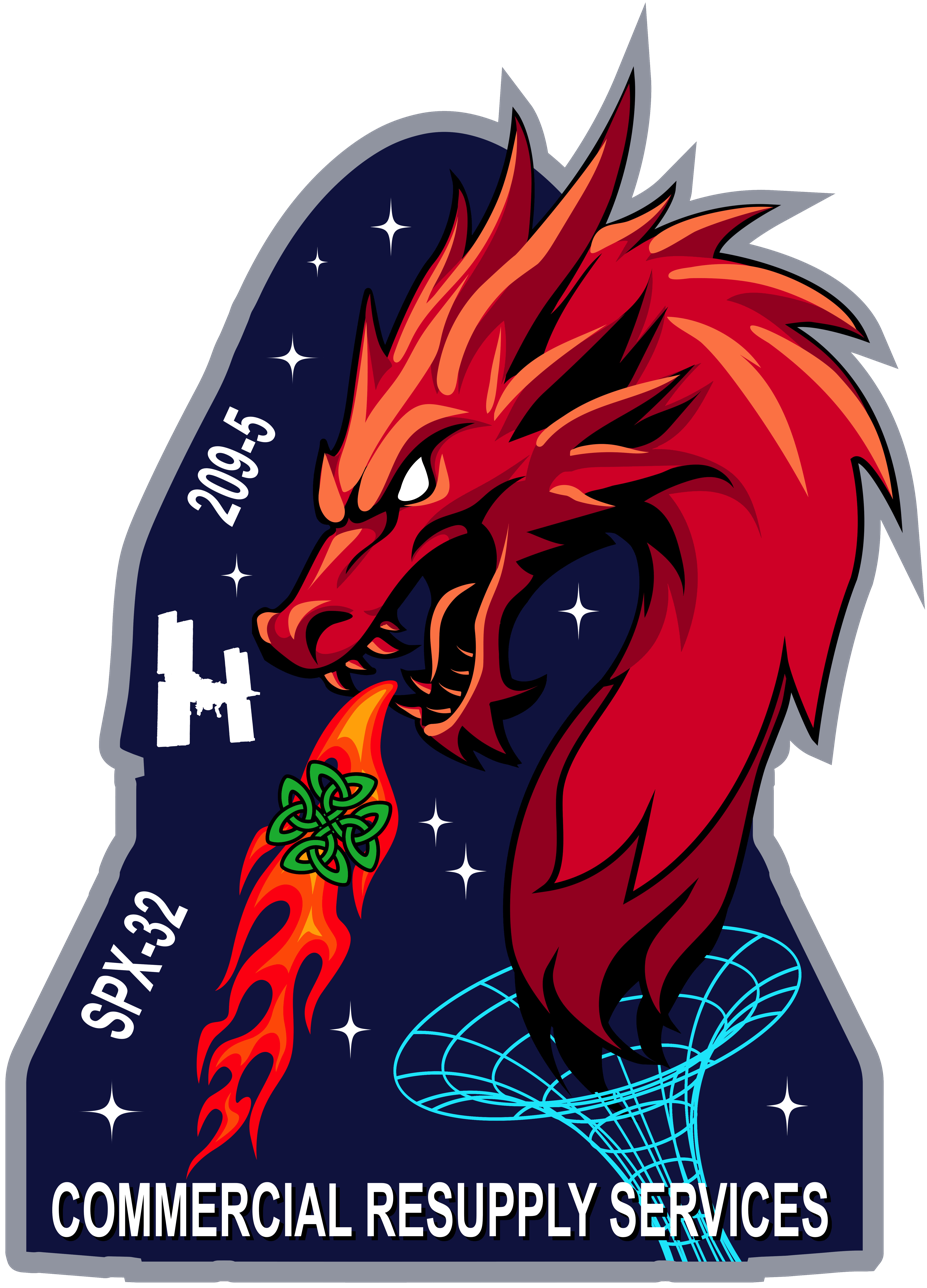
- SpaceX CRS-32 Mission patch Commercial Resupply Services Cargo Dragon flights

SpaceX CRS-32, also known as SpX-32, was a International Space Station (ISS) resupply mission operated by SpaceX under NASA's Commercial Resupply Services (CRS) contract. The mission utilized a Cargo Dragon spacecraft, designated C209, marking the capsule's fifth flight.

== Manifest ==
The spacecraft was loaded with a total of 3,021 kg (6,660 lb) of cargo, including 2,168 kg (4,780 lb) of pressurized and 750 kg (1,650 lb) of unpressurized payloads.

The cargo manifest is broken down as follows:

- Crew supplies: 1,468 kg (3,236 lb)
- Science investigations: 255 kg (562 lb)
- Spacewalk equipment: 190 kg (420 lb)
- Vehicle hardware: 255 kg (562 lb)
- Computer resources: 8 kg (18 lb)

== Research ==
Several scientific investigations were delivered to the International Space Station aboard the Cargo Dragon spacecraft. NASA highlighted the following six experiments:

=== Earth Imaging and Space Radiation Sensing ===
STP Houston 10 flew 6 instruments to the International Space Station to measure the effects of solar radiation, Earth imagery, remote sensing, materials exposure, and astrophysics on the exterior of the station and future aircraft and spacecraft.

Neutron Radiation Detection Instrument

This experiment will measure the effects of solar radiation and cosmic radiation on computer chips to protect them from solar flares and also from EMP.

Falcon ODIN

This experiment will use high speed Earth sensing photography to measure the effects of lightning and also radiation sprites in the upper atmosphere.

TERI and CZT

These experiments are neutron radiation detectors. They will measure the pulse of plasma and also radiation on the exterior of the International Space Station.

SEED

These are a series of space exposure experiments which will expose new technologies to the vacuum of space.

SPADE-3

This is a NASA project that will monitor the effects of space weather and also the timing of solar storms.

SFXTI

This experiment will monitor the effects of solar flares and also the dynamics of solar storms. Principal sponsor for this experiment is NASA and Montana State University.

=== Atomic Clocks in Space ===
After years of delays, the ACES experiment is finally flying to the International Space Station. This experiment will mount two atomic clocks onto the exterior of the Columbus module on side plane number four through the life of the International Space Station or when the clocks' batteries run out.

== Gallery ==
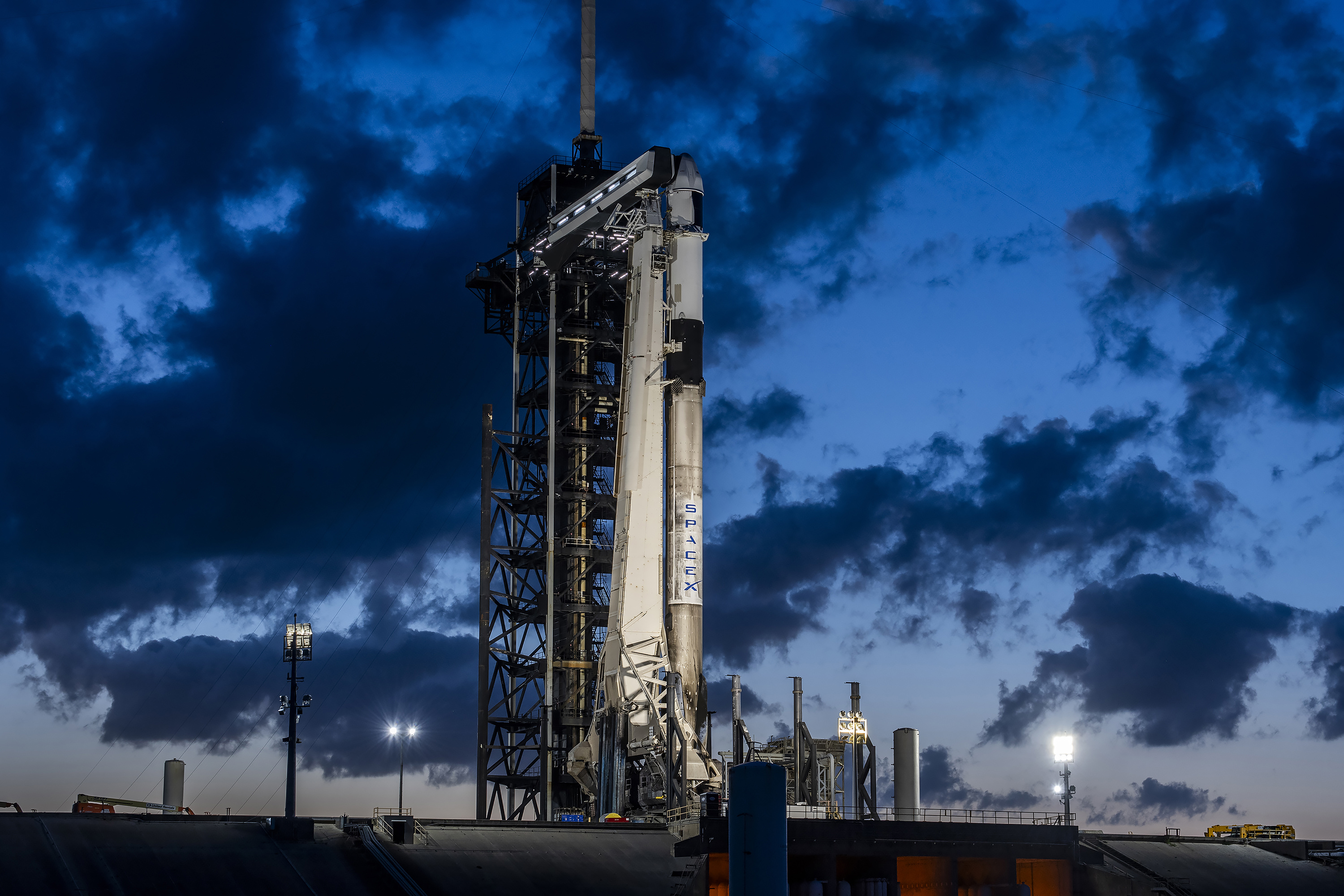
SpaceX CRS-32 stands in a vertical position at LC-39A

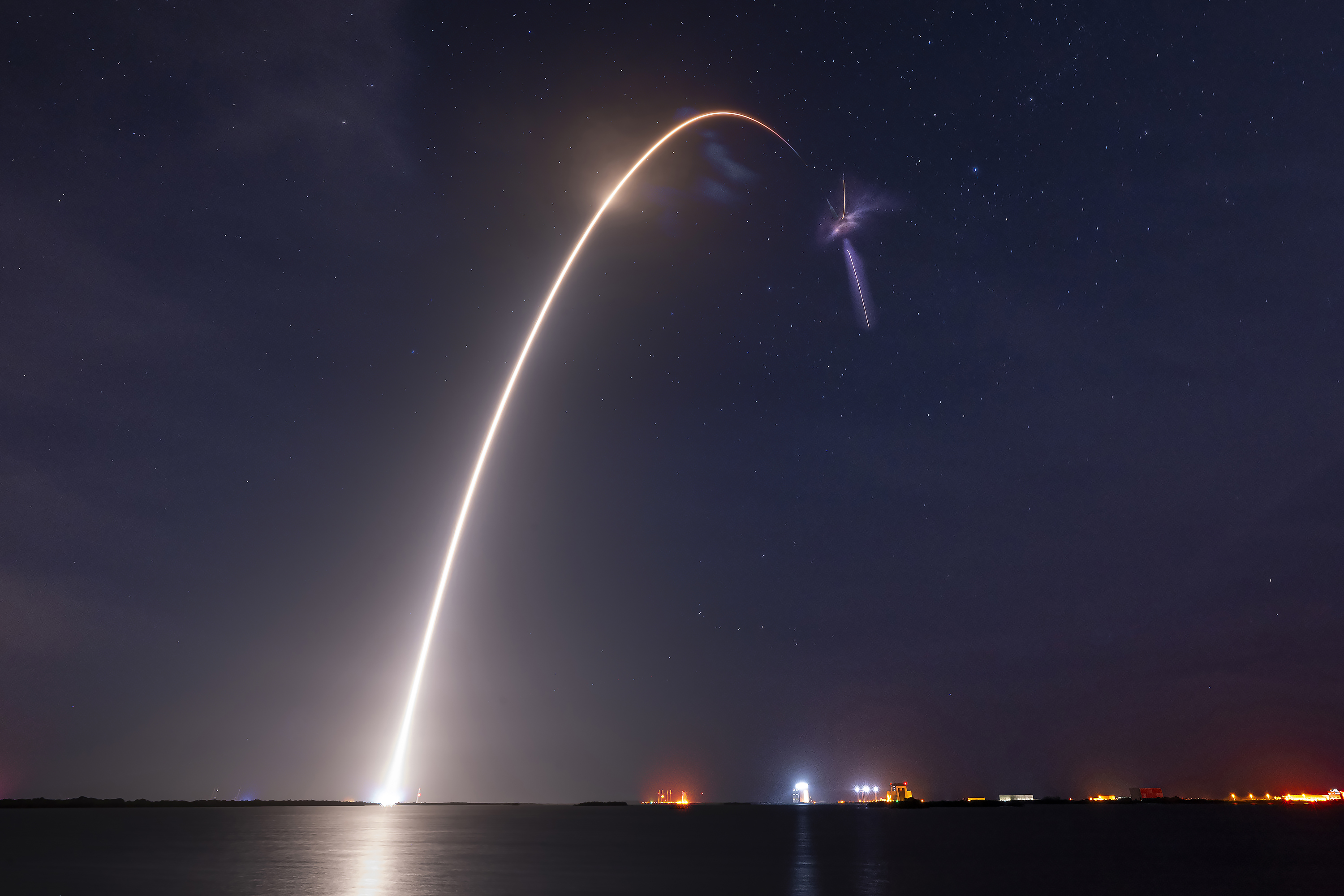
A long-exposure photo shows lift off, second-stage ignition, and first-stage boostback

== See also ==
- Uncrewed spaceflights to the International Space Station
