= SpaceX CRS-22 =

2021 American supply spaceflight to the International Space Station

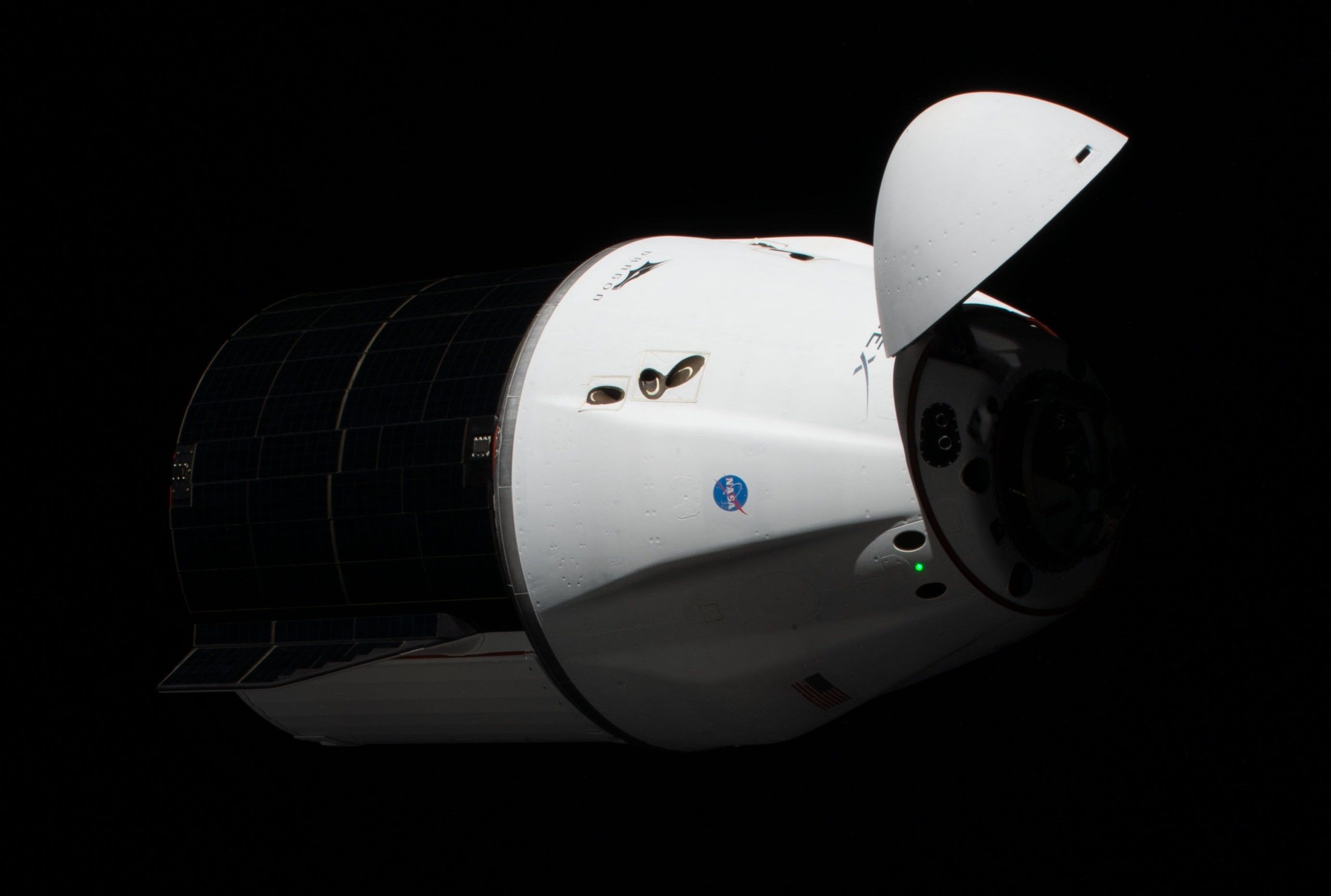
- CRS-22 Cargo Dragon approaching the ISS
- Names: SpX-22
- Mission type: ISS resupply
- Operator: SpaceX
- COSPAR ID: 2021-048A
- SATCAT no.: 48831
- Mission duration: 36 days, 9 hours, 59 minutes

Spacecraft properties
- Spacecraft: Cargo Dragon C209
- Spacecraft type: Cargo Dragon
- Manufacturer: SpaceX
- Launch mass: 6,000 kg (13,000 lb)
- Payload mass: 3,328 kg (7,337 lb)
- Dimensions: 8.1 m (27 ft) (height); 4 m (13 ft) (diameter)

Start of mission
- Launch date: 3 June 2021, 17:29:15 UTC
- Rocket: Falcon 9 Block 5 B1067-1
- Launch site: Kennedy Space Center, LC-39A

End of mission
- Recovered by: MV GO Navigator
- Landing date: 10 July 2021, 03:29 UTC
- Landing site: Gulf of Mexico

Orbital parameters
- Reference system: Geocentric orbit
- Regime: Low Earth orbit
- Inclination: 51.66°

Docking with ISS
- Docking port: Harmony zenith
- Docking date: 5 June 2021, 09:09 UTC
- Undocking date: 8 July 2021, 14:45 UTC
- Time docked: 34 days, 5 hours, 36 minutes

Cargo
- Mass: 3,328 kg (7,337 lb)
- Pressurised: 1,948 kg (4,295 lb)
- Unpressurised: 1,380 kg (3,040 lb)
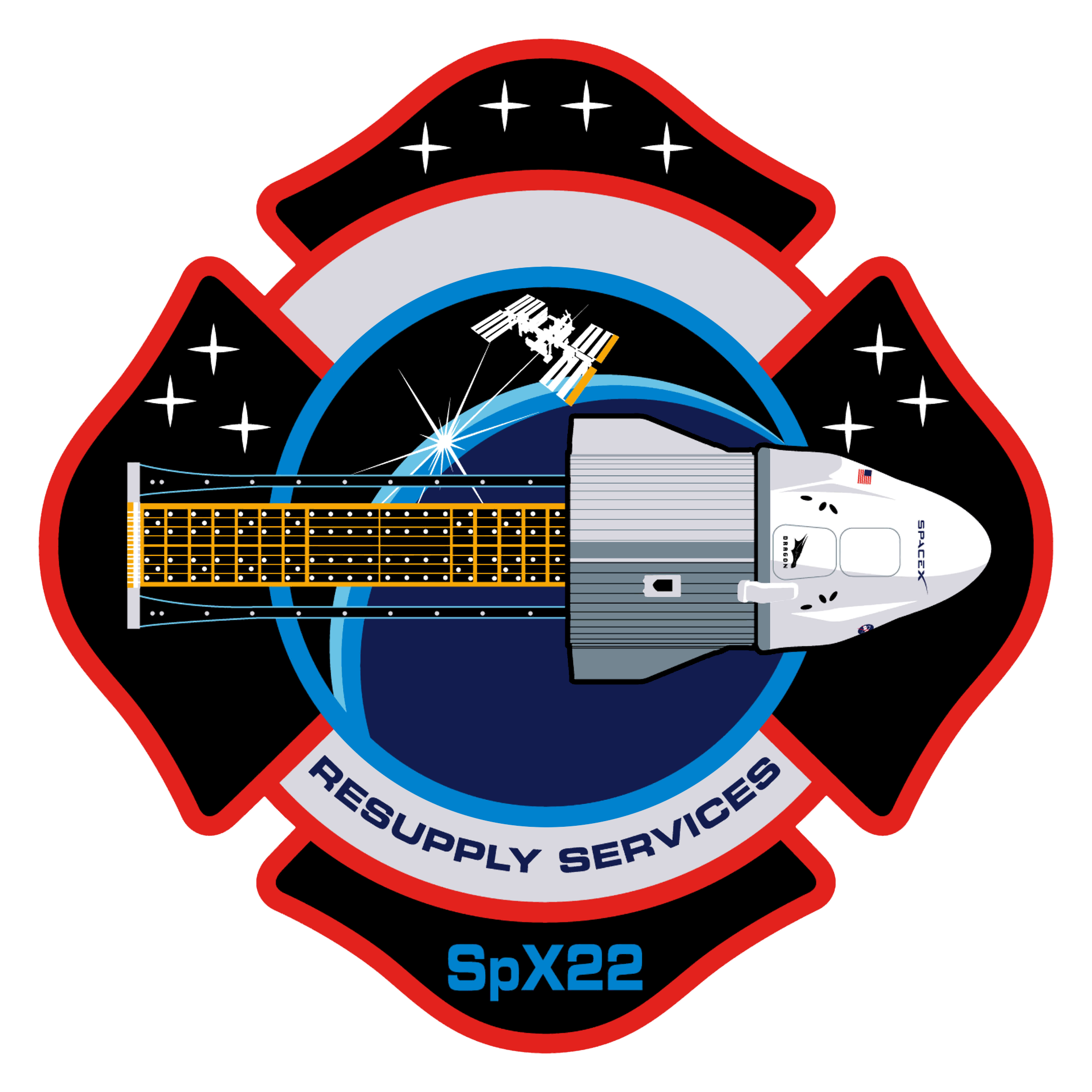
- SpaceX CRS-22 mission patch Commercial Resupply Services Cargo Dragon missions

SpaceX CRS-22, also known as SpX-22, was a Commercial Resupply Services (CRS) mission to the International Space Station (ISS) that launched at 17:29:15 UTC on 3 June 2021. The mission is contracted by NASA and is flown by SpaceX using a Cargo Dragon 2. This is the second flight for SpaceX under NASA's CRS Phase 2 contract awarded in January 2016.

== Cargo Dragon ==
SpaceX plans to reuse the Cargo Dragons up to five times. Since it does not support a crew, the Cargo Dragon launches without SuperDraco abort engines, seats, cockpit controls or the life support system required to sustain astronauts in space. Dragon 2 improves on Dragon 1 in several ways, including lessened refurbishment time, leading to shorter periods between flights.

The new Cargo Dragon capsules under the NASA CRS Phase 2 contract splash down under parachutes in the Gulf of Mexico rather than the previous recovery zone in the Pacific Ocean west of Baja California under the NASA CRS Phase 1 contract.

== Mission ==
=== Timeline ===
T+00:00: Liftoff

T+01:15: Maximum aerodynamic pressure

T+02:30: First stage main engine cutoff (MECO)

T+02:34: Stage separation

T+02:41: Second stage engine start

T+02:48: First stage Boostback Burn

T+05:58: First stage entry burn begins

T+07:22: First stage landing burn

T+07:52: First stage landing on drone ship

T+08:46: Second stage engine cutoff (SECO)

T+11:58: Dragon separation

T+12:35: Dragon nose cone open sequence begins

== Payload ==
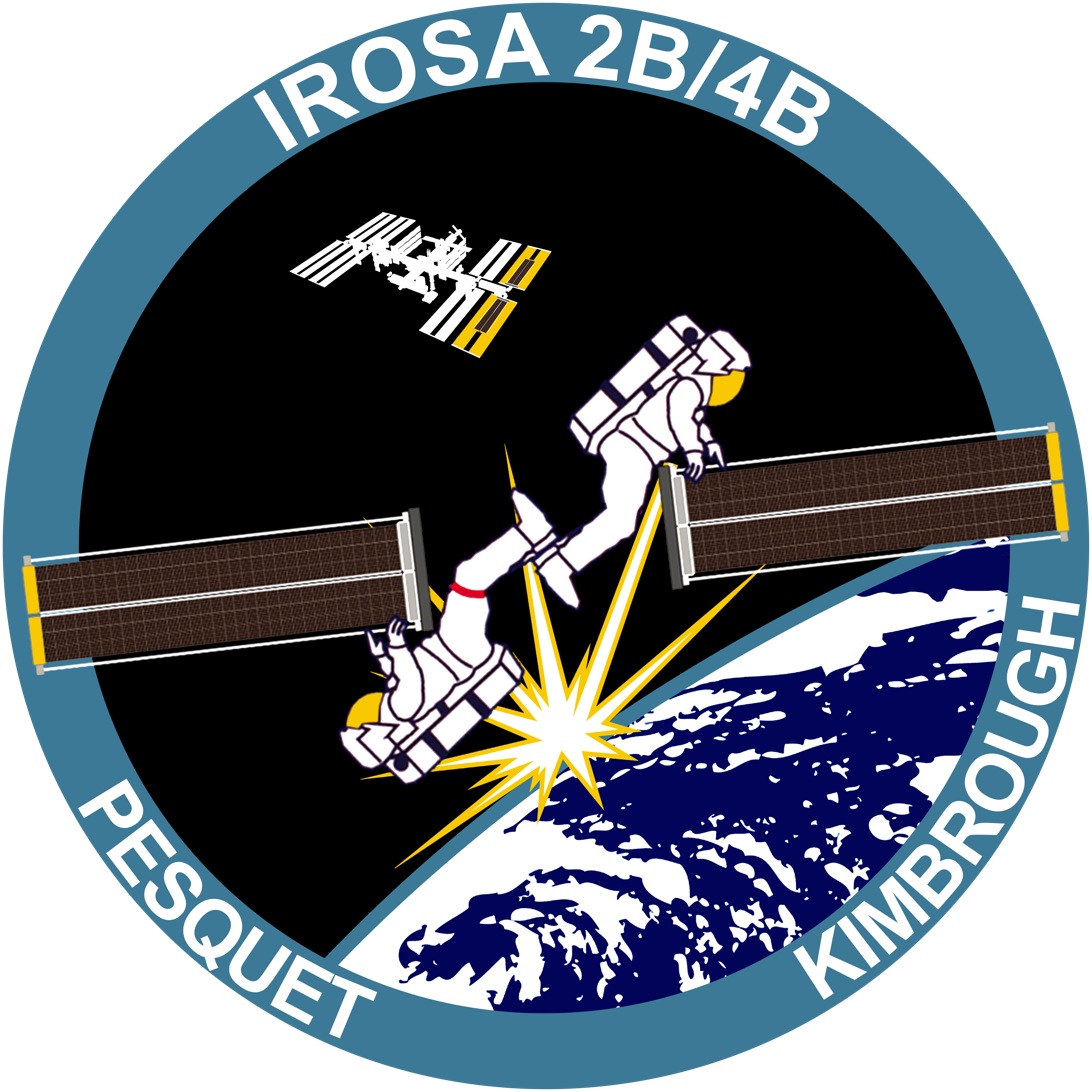
ISS iROSA 2B and 4B mission patch

NASA contracted for the CRS-22 mission from SpaceX and therefore determines the primary payload, date of launch, and orbital parameters for the Cargo Dragon. The total mission payload is 3,328 kg (7,337 lb).

- Science investigations: 920 kg (2,030 lb)
- Vehicle hardware: 345 kg (761 lb)
- Crew supplies: 341 kg (752 lb)
- Spacewalk equipment: 52 kg (115 lb)
- Computer resources: 58 kg (128 lb)
- External payloads: 1,380 kg (3,040 lb)

=== ISS Roll Out Solar Arrays (iROSA) ===
First pair of new roll-out solar arrays, namely, 2B and 4B, using XTJ Prime space solar cells, based on a design tested at ISS in 2017. They will be delivered to the station in the unpressurized trunk of the SpaceX Cargo Dragon CRS-22 spacecraft. A second pair was delivered to the ISS on CRS-26 in late 2022, followed by another pair on CRS-28 due to be delivered in June 2023. The installation of these new solar arrays requires two spacewalks: one to prepare the worksite with a modification kit, on 16 June 2021, and another to install the new panel, on 20 June 2021.

Additional hardware carried internally includes:

- Catalytic Reactor: legacy unit launching to provide critical sparing support for the water production capability for the environmental control and life support system (ECLSS)
- Commercial Crew Vehicle Emergency Breathing Air Assembly (CEBAA) Regulator Manifold Assembly (RMA): completing the first set of emergency air supply capability, this integrated system supports as many as five crew members for up to 1 hour during an ISS emergency ammonia leak
- Zarya Kurs Electronics Unit: critical hardware for cosmonaut remote-control docking of Russian spacecraft is launching to support planned maintenance activity during 2021
- Potable Water Dispenser (PWD) Filter: major filter assembly used to remove iodine from water consumed by the crew during nominal operations
- Commercial off-the-shelf (COTS) Air Tanks: critical disposable air tanks to support gas resupply for routine cabin repress activities in-orbit
- Iceberg: critical cold stowage capability to support expanded payload operations

== Research ==
The new experiments arriving at the orbiting laboratory on the SpaceX CRS-22 mission support science from human health to high-powered computing, and utilize the space station as a proving ground for new technologies.

Among the investigations arriving inside the Dragon's pressurized capsule will be a variety of research experiments and studies, including:

- Develop better pharmaceuticals and therapies for treating kidney disease on Earth
- Using cotton root systems to identify varieties of plants that require less water and pesticides
- Test new portable ultrasound technology in microgravity (Butterfly IQ Ultrasound)

Two model organism investigations:

- One study will look at bobtail squid Euprymna scolopes as a model to examine the effects of spaceflight on interactions between beneficial microbes and their animal hosts.
- Second study will examine tardigrades' adaptation to the harsh environment of space, which could contribute to long-term problem solving for vaccine production, distribution, and storage on Earth

NASA Glenn Research Center studies:

- Combustion Integration Rack (CIR) Reconfiguration

Student Spaceflight Experiments Program

The Student Spaceflight Experiments Program (SSEP) has five experiments manifested:

- Mission 14B – 3 experiments
- Mission 15A – 2 experiments

ISS United States National Laboratory

The ISS U.S. National Laboratory is sponsoring more than a dozen payloads with education and commercial partners. These include:

- Colgate-Palmolive – oral biofilms investigation
- Eli Lilly – investigation to examine the effects of gravity on the physical state and properties of freeze-dried pharmaceutical products

== CubeSats ==
ELaNa 36: One CubeSat is scheduled for deployment on this mission:

- RamSat – Oak Ridge Public Schools (Robertsville Middle School), Oak Ridge, Tennessee

Nanoracks CubeSat deployments:

- SOAR – University of Manchester, United Kingdom and the DISCOVERER consortium with EU/EC Horizon 2020 funding.

UNOOSA / JAXA KiboCUBE program:

- MIR-SAT1 – Mauritius Research and Innovation Council (MRIC)
- G-SATELLITE 2 – OneTeam, Tokyo Organising Committee of the Olympic and Paralympic Games (TOCOG)

== Returning hardware ==
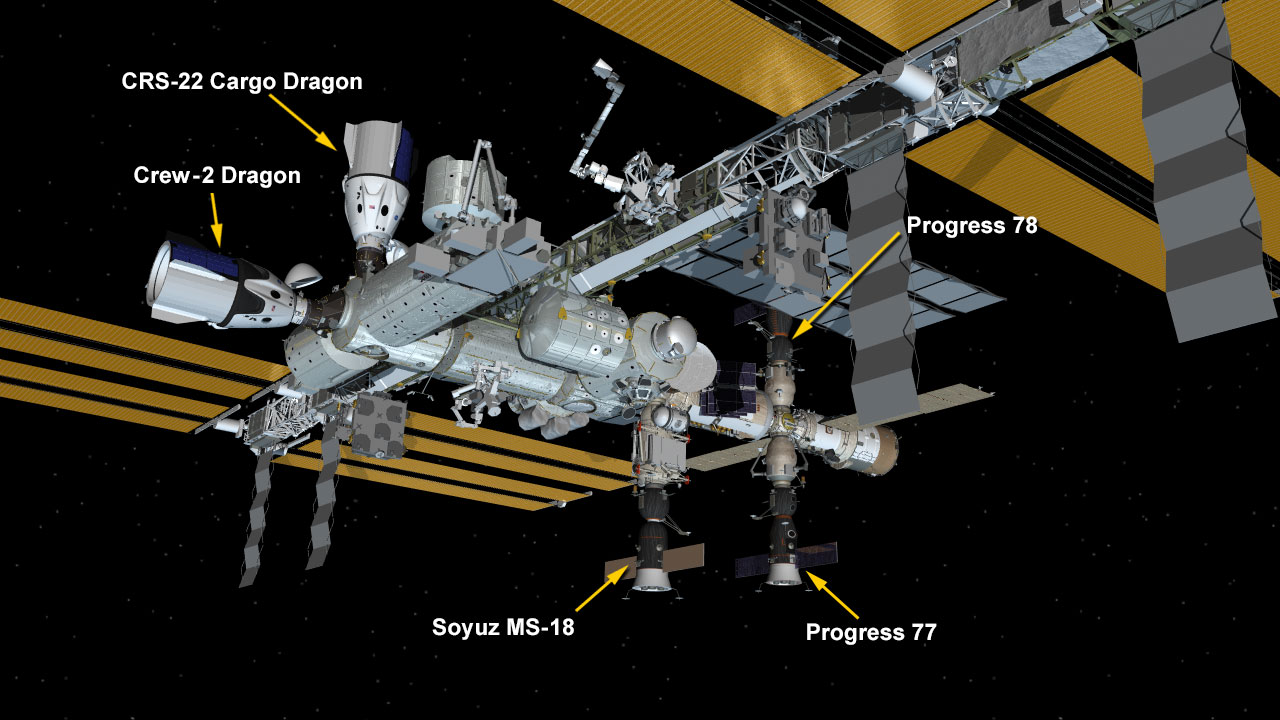
The vehicles docked to the ISS prior to the departure of SpaceX CRS-22.

Beginning with returning capsules or lifting bodies under the CRS-2 contract, NASA reports major hardware (failed or expended hardware for diagnostic assessment, refurbishment, repair, or no longer needed) returning from the International Space Station. The SpaceX CRS-22 mission ends on 10 July 2021, this is a two-day delay from the original undocking target of 6 July 2021 as a result of Tropical Storm/Hurricane Elsa causing weather concerns at the splashdown zones, with re-entry into atmosphere of Earth and splash down in the Gulf of Mexico near the western coast of Florida with 2,404 kg (5,300 lb) of return cargo.

- Catalytic Reactor Developmental Test Objective (DTO): developmental environmental control and life support system (ECLSS) unit returning for testing, teardown, and evaluation (TT&E) to determine the cause of failure and subsequent re-flight
- Urine Processing Assembly (UPA) Distillation Assembly: critical ECLSS orbital replacement unit used for urine distillation, processing, and future use returning for TT&E and refurbishment to support future spares demand
- Sabatier Main Controller: major Sabatier system hardware used in conjunction with the Oxygen Generation System (OGS) for water production needs on-orbit
- Rodent Research Habitats (AEM-X): habitats used during Rodent Research missions returning for refurbishment to support future missions in early 2022
- Nitrogen/Oxygen Recharge System (NORS) Recharge Tank Assembly (RTA): empty gas tanks returning for reuse to support high-pressure gas operations and activities on-orbit

== Gallery ==
SpaceX CRS-22
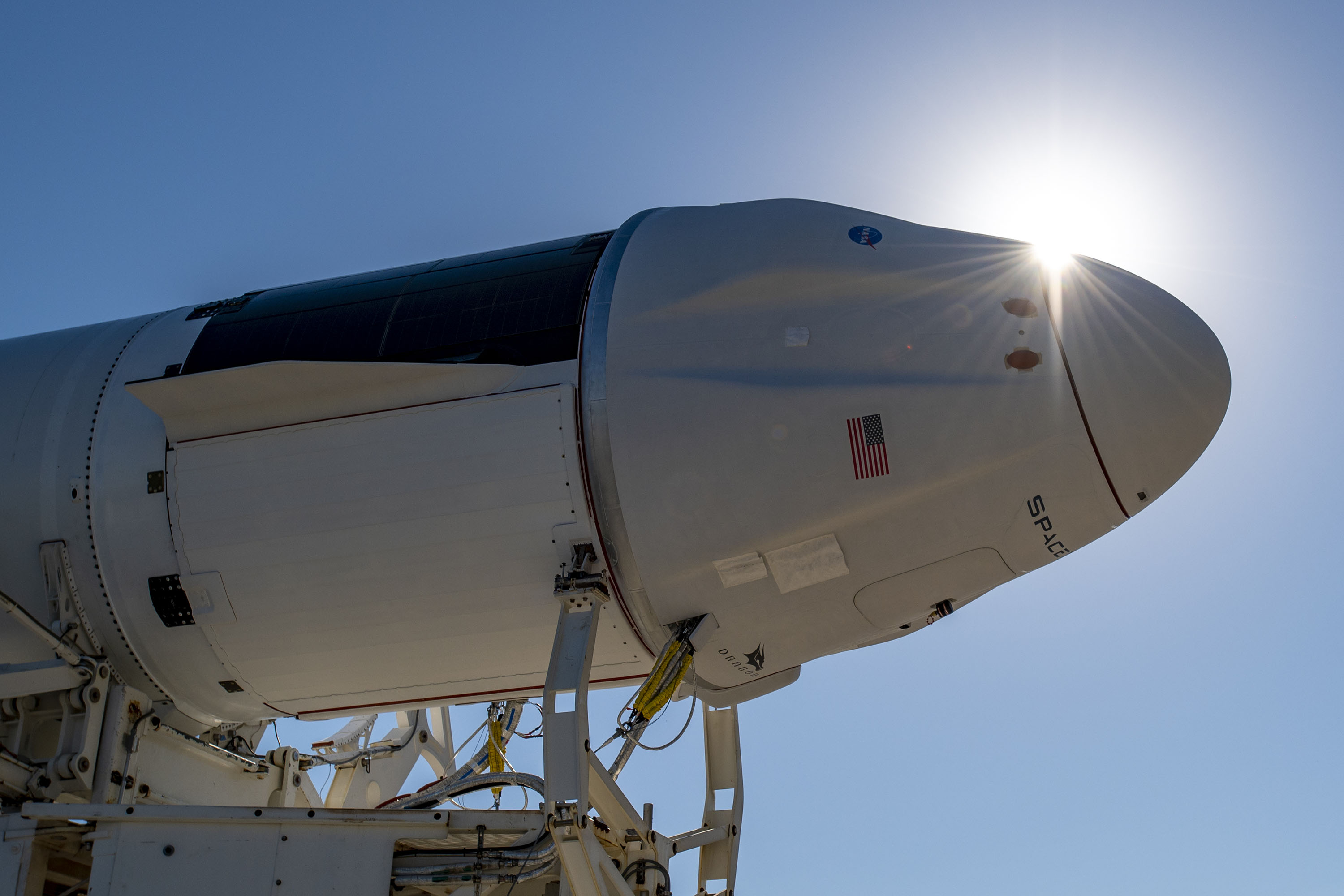
CRS-22 rolling out

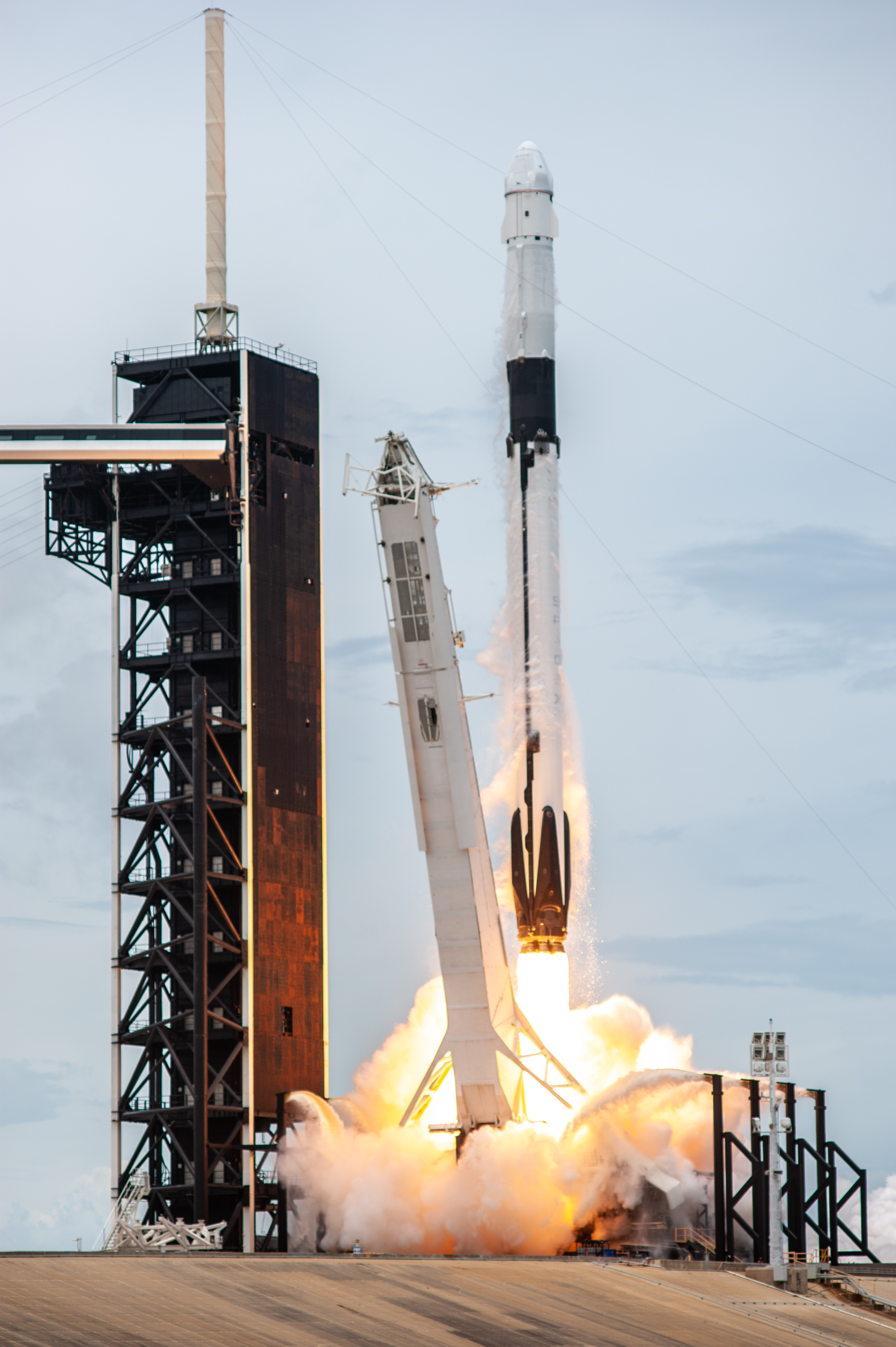
Launch of CRS-22

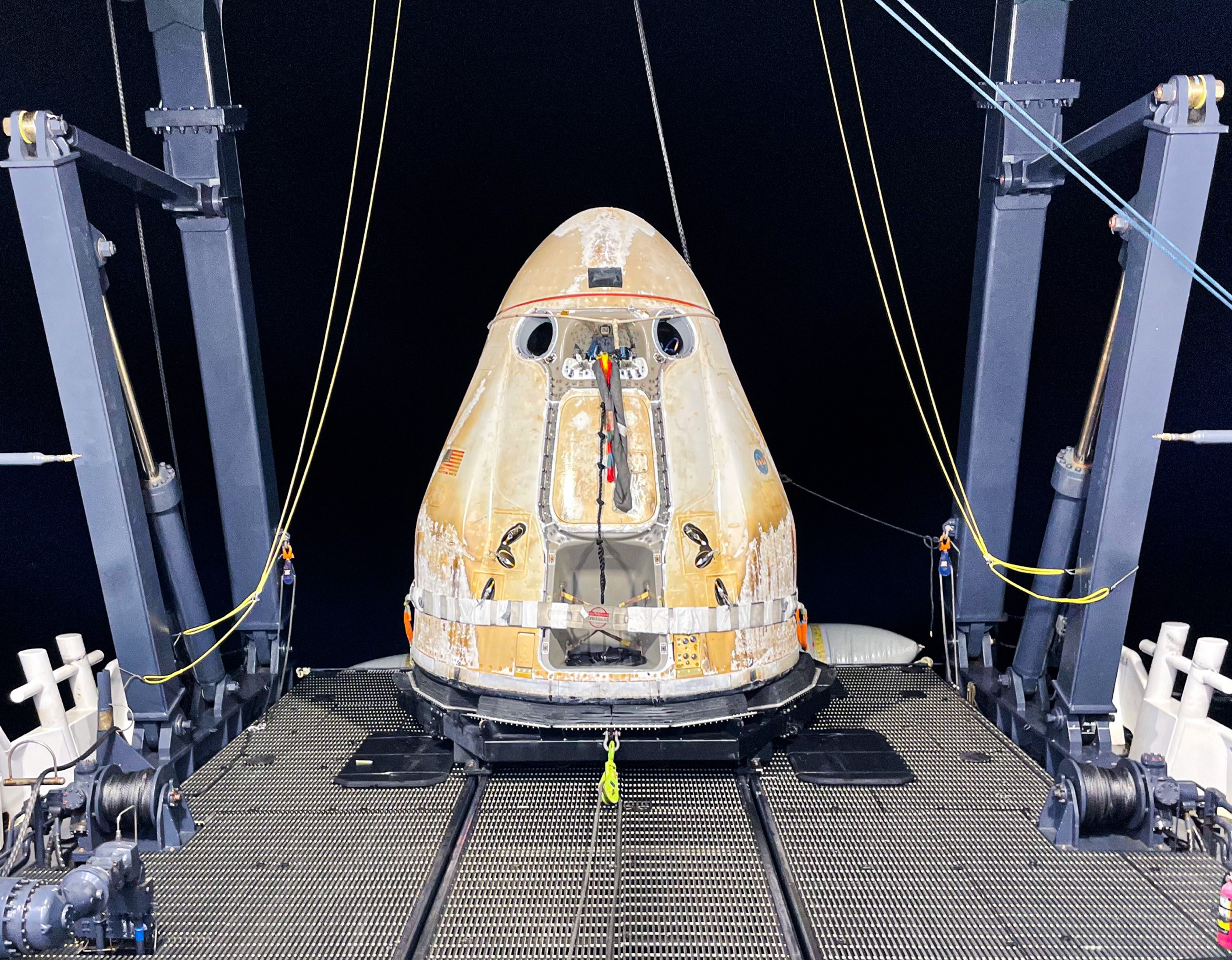
Cargo Dragon after splashdown

== See also ==
- Uncrewed spaceflights to the International Space Station
