= SpaceX CRS-34 =

Spring 2026 cargo resupply mission to the International Space Station

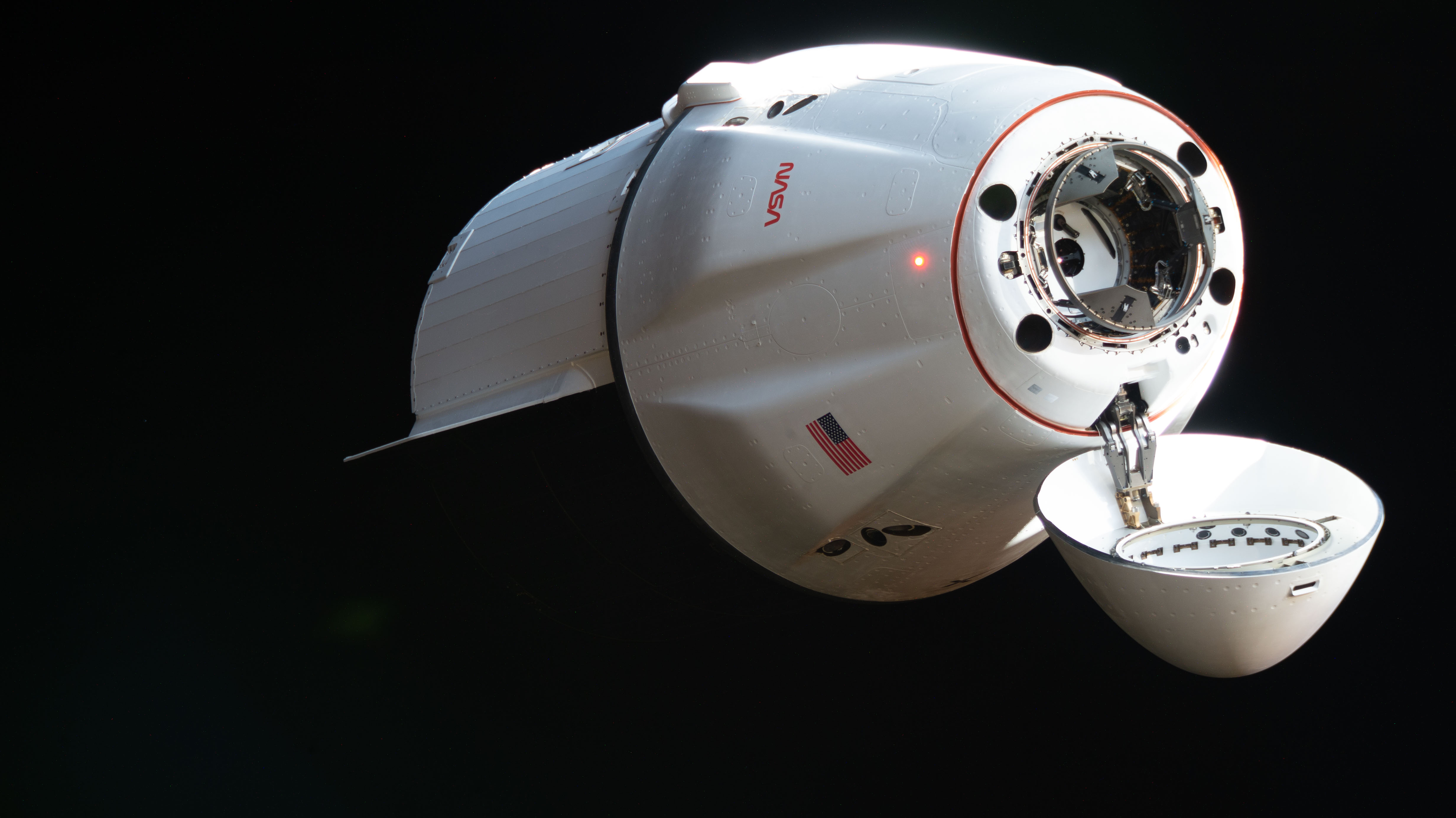
- Cargo Dragon C209 approaches the International Space Station on May 17, 2026
- Names: CRS SpX-34
- Mission type: ISS resupply
- Operator: SpaceX
- COSPAR ID: 2026-107A
- SATCAT no.: 69103
- Mission duration: 32 days, 14 hours, 5 minutes

Spacecraft properties
- Spacecraft: Cargo Dragon C209
- Spacecraft type: Cargo Dragon
- Manufacturer: SpaceX

Start of mission
- Launch date: May 15, 2026, 22:05:41 UTC (6:05:41 pm EDT)
- Rocket: Falcon 9 Block 5 (B1096‑6), Flight 638
- Launch site: Cape Canaveral, SLC‑40

End of mission
- Recovered by: MV Shannon
- Landing date: June 17, 2026, 12:11 UTC (5:11 am PDT)
- Landing site: Pacific Ocean near Oceanside

Orbital parameters
- Reference system: Geocentric orbit
- Regime: Low Earth orbit

Docking with ISS
- Docking port: Harmony forward
- Docking date: May 17, 2026, 10:37 UTC
- Undocking date: June 16, 2026, 16:25 UTC
- Time docked: 30 days, 5 hours, 48 minutes

Cargo
- Mass: 2,948 kg (6,499 lb)
- Pressurised: 2,132 kg (4,700 lb)
- Unpressurised: 816 kg (1,799 lb)
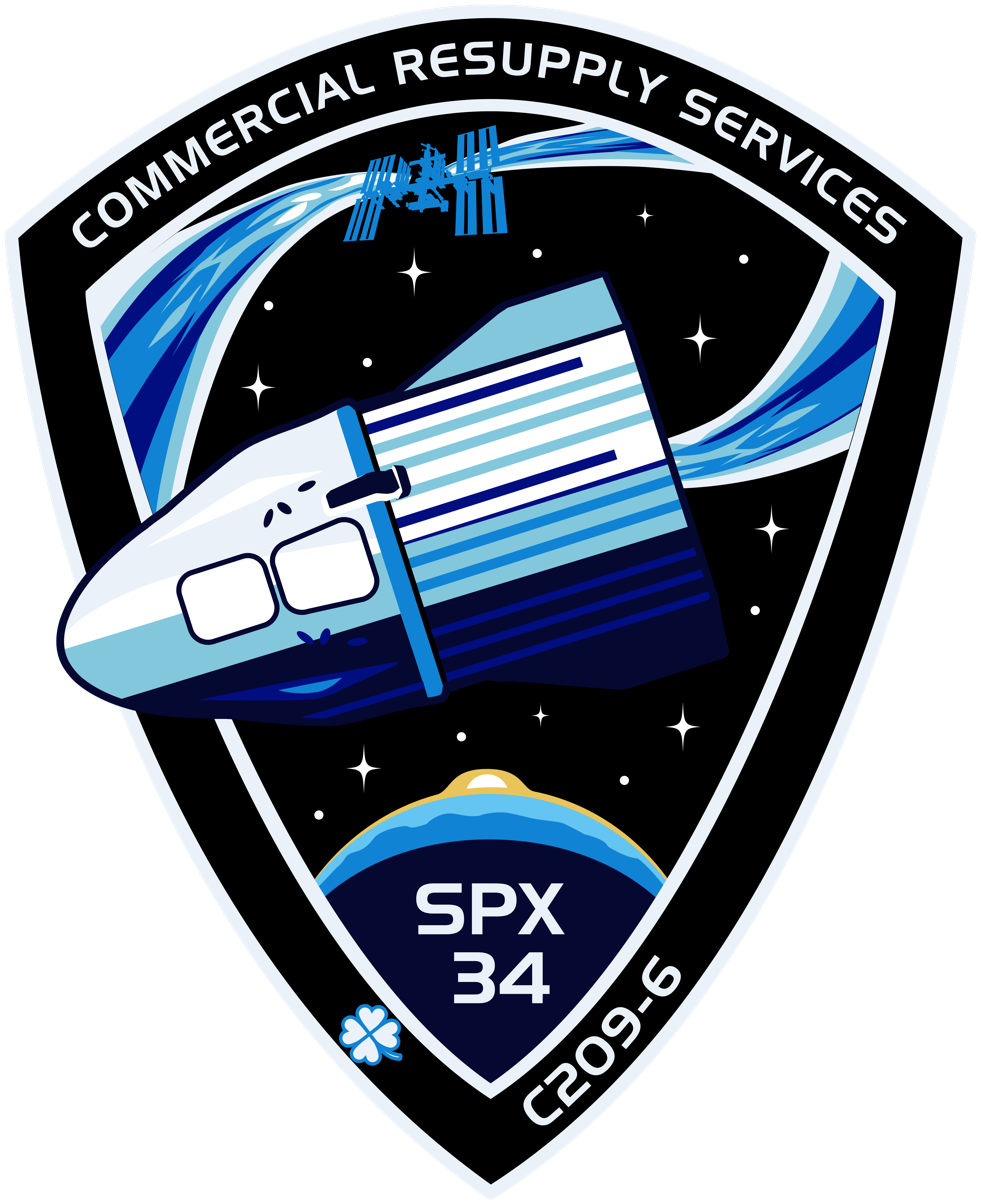
- Mission insignia Commercial Resupply Services Cargo Dragon flights

SpaceX CRS-34, also known as SpX-34, was an International Space Station (ISS) cargo resupply mission contracted by NASA and operated by SpaceX. The flight launched on May 15, 2026, from Space Launch Complex 40 at Cape Canaveral Space Force Station. It is SpaceX's 34th cargo delivery mission under the Commercial Resupply Services program. The mission used Cargo Dragon C209, marking the spacecraft's sixth flight, along with Falcon 9 booster B1096 on its sixth flight.

== Manifest ==
The spacecraft was loaded with 2,948 kg (6,499 lb) of cargo, comprising:

- Pressurized payload: 2,132 kg (4,700 lb)
  - Crew supplies: 618 kg (1,362 lb)
  - Science investigations: 831 kg (1,832 lb)
  - Spacewalk equipment: 128 kg (282 lb)
  - Vehicle hardware: 469 kg (1,034 lb)
  - Computer resources: 84 kg (185 lb)
- Unpressurized payload: 816 kg (1,799 lb)
  - CLARREO Pathfinder and STP-H11 were carried as unpressurized payloads inside the trunk

Some NASA scientific payloads on CRS-34 are:

- ODYSSEY: microgravity simulators to conduct space biology studies.
- Green Bone: a bone scaffold made from rattan wood that acts like real bone.
- SPARK: studies how the spleen changes and how red blood cells break down in space.
- CLARREO Pathfinder: measures sunlight reflected by the Earth and the Moon.
- Laplace: study of the evolution and growth of dust aggregates in proto-planetary disks.
- STORIE: charged particle "storm ring" detector.

Other cargo includes replacement parts and upgrades for onboard exercise equipment, water management, waste management, as well as new maintenance equipment. The mission also carried a prototype of the French IVA spacesuit developed by Spartan Space for testing by the ESA astronaut Sophie Adenot.

== Launch ==
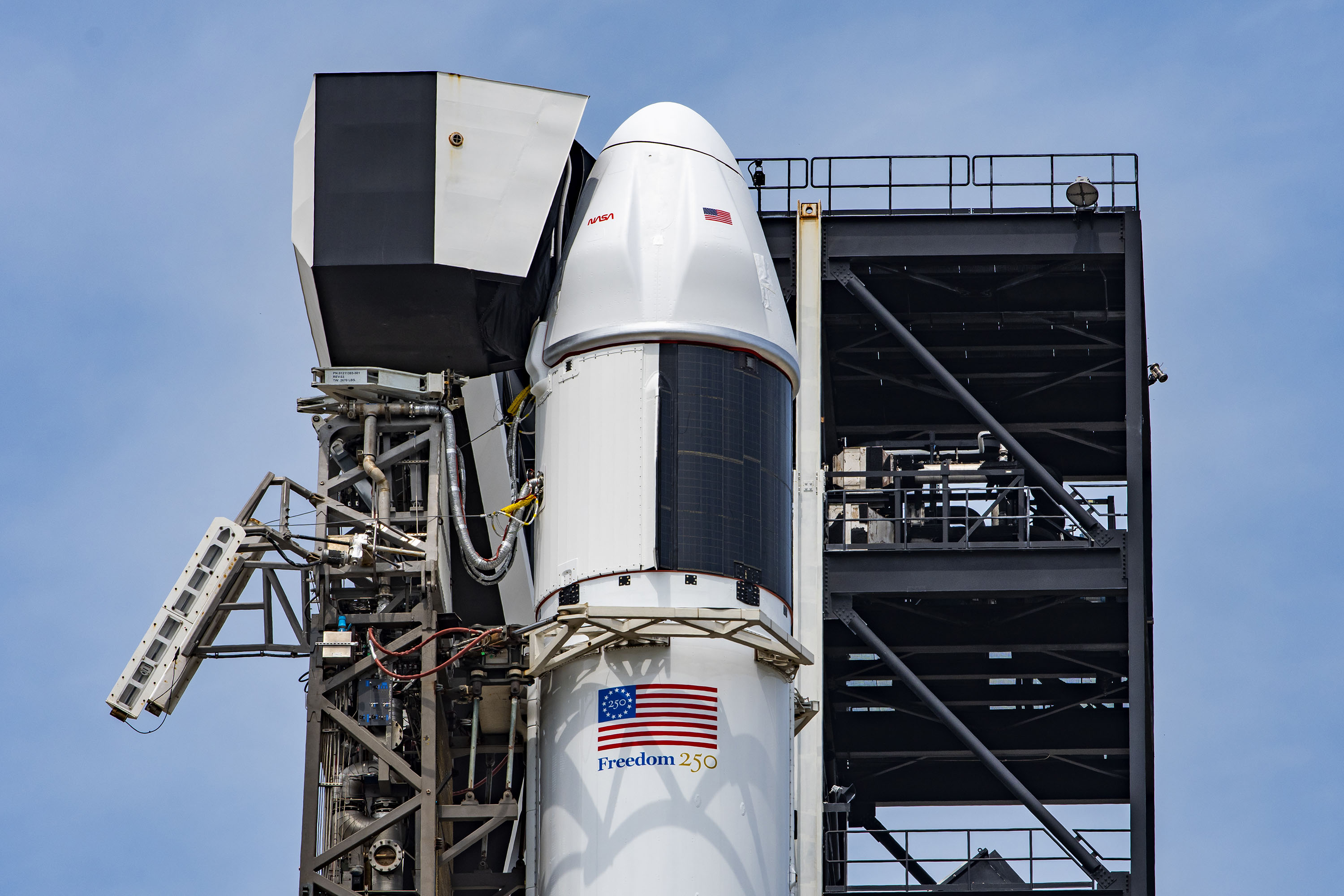
Cargo Dragon C209 sits atop a Falcon 9 rocket with Freedom 250 logo at Cape Canaveral Space Launch Complex 40

NASA selected a targeted launch date of no earlier than May 12, 2026, at 00:16 UTC (7:16 p.m. EDT on May 11) for CRS-34, with a backup opportunity on May 13 at 22:50 UTC (6:50 p.m. EDT).

On May 11, 2026, at 17:00 UTC (1:00 p.m. EDT), the 45th Weather Squadron forecast a 35 percent chance of favorable weather conditions for the May 12 attempt, improving to 65 percent for the May 13 opportunity.

NASA scrubbed the May 12, 2026, attempt at 20:26 UTC (4:26 p.m. EDT) due to poor weather conditions. The following day's attempt was scrubbed at T−28 seconds at approximately 22:50 UTC (6:50 p.m. EDT).

A third launch attempt was successfully on May 15, 2026, at 22:05:41 UTC (18:05:41 EDT). The 45th Weather Squadron forecasted a 90 percent chance of favorable conditions for the launch.

=== Launch attempt summary ===
Note: Times are local to the launch site (Eastern Daylight Time).

| Attempt | Planned | Result | Turnaround | Reason | Decision point | Weather go (%) | Notes |
|---|---|---|---|---|---|---|---|
| 1 | 12 May 2026, 7:16:00 pm | Scrubbed | — | Weather | 12 May 2026, 4:26 pm | 35 | |
| 2 | 13 May 2026, 6:50:50 pm | Scrubbed | 0 days 23 hours 35 minutes | Weather | 13 May 2026, 6:50 pm (T−0:28) | 65 | |
| 3 | 15 May 2026, 6:05:41 pm | Success | 1 day 23 hours 15 minutes | | | 90 | |

== Arrival ==
NASA astronaut Jack Hathaway and ESA astronaut Sophie Adenot monitored CRS-34's automatic arrival and docking with the ISS at 10:37 UTC on May 17.

== Return and disposal ==
CRS-34 undocked from the ISS on June 16 at 12:25pm, completing its 30 day stay at the ISS before splashing down outside of Oceanside at 8:11am on June 17. CRS-34 brought back several research projects including bioprinted organ and cartilage tissue, data on improving cryogenic fuel storage, and new DNA-inspired materials for cancer treatments.

== See also ==
- Uncrewed spaceflights to the International Space Station
