= Cargo Dragon C209 =

Uncrewed cargo capsule built by SpaceX

Dragon C209
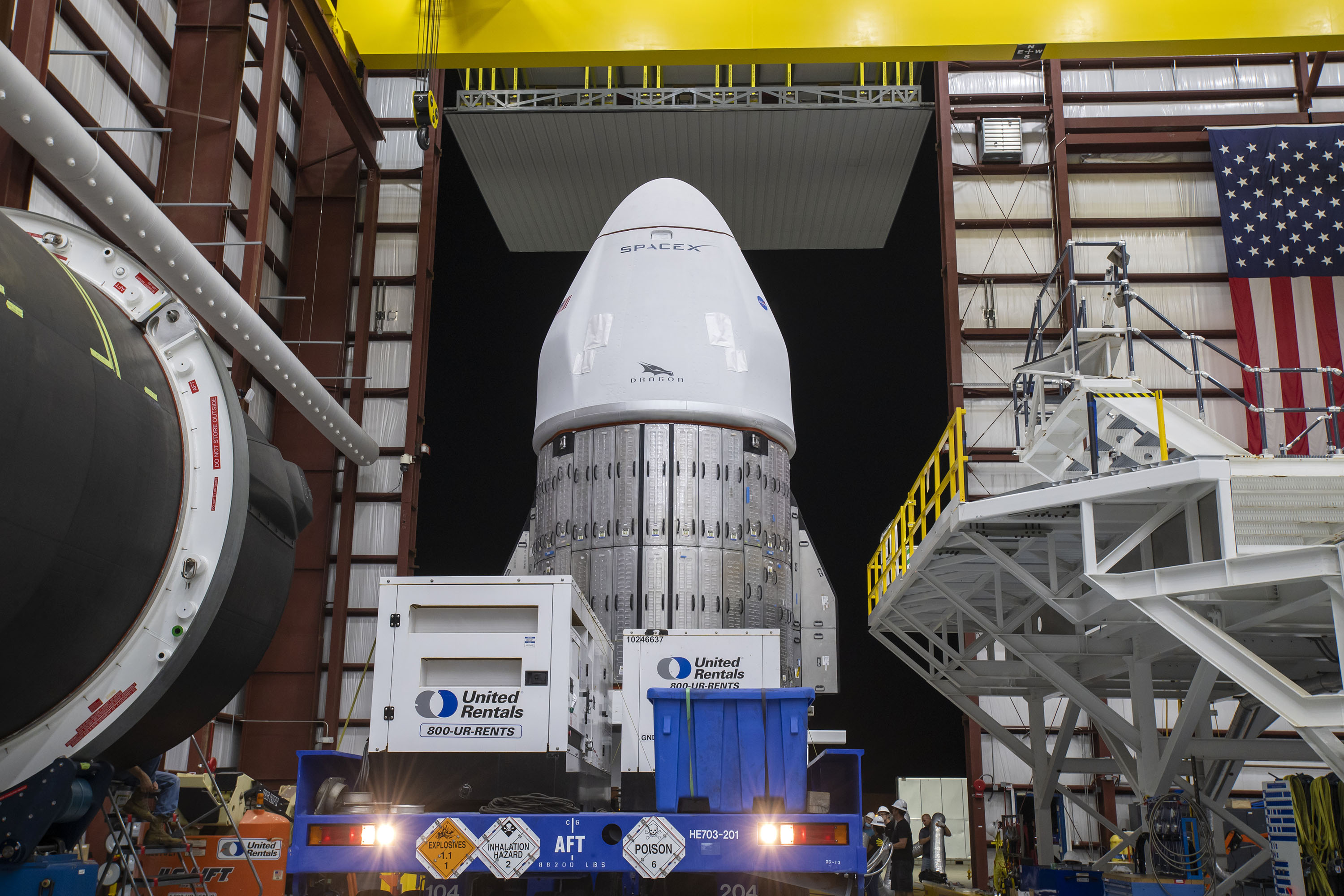
- C209 at Kennedy in May 2021.
- Type: Space capsule
- Class: Dragon 2
- Owner: SpaceX
- Manufacturer: SpaceX

Specifications
- Dimensions: 4.4 m × 3.7 m (14 ft × 12 ft)
- Power: Solar panel
- Rocket: Falcon 9 Block 5

History
- Location: California
- First flight: June 3, 2021 – July 10, 2021; SpaceX CRS-22
- Last flight: May 15, 2026 - June 17, 2026; SpaceX CRS-34
- Flights: 6
- Flight time: 208 days, 13 hours and 41 minutes

Dragon 2s

Dragon C209 is the second Cargo Dragon 2 spacecraft, and the second in a line of International Space Station resupply craft which replaced the Dragon capsule, manufactured by SpaceX. The missions are contracted by NASA under the Commercial Resupply Services (CRS) program. It was being flown for the first time on the CRS-22 mission on June 3, 2021. This was the second flight for SpaceX under NASA's CRS Phase 2 contract awarded in January 2016. This was also the second time a Cargo Dragon was docked at the same time as a Crew Dragon spacecraft, SpaceX Crew-2. This mission used a new Booster B1067.1.

== Cargo Dragon ==
C209 is the second SpaceX Dragon 2 cargo variant. C209 and the other Cargo Dragons are different from the crewed variant by launching without seats, cockpit controls, astronaut life support systems, or SuperDraco abort engines. The Cargo Dragon improved on many aspects of the original Dragon design, including the recovery and refurbishment process.

The new Cargo Dragon capsules splash down under parachutes in the Atlantic Ocean east of Florida or in the Gulf of Mexico, rather than the previous recovery zone in the Pacific Ocean west of Baja California. This NASA preference was added to all CRS-2 awards to allow for cargo to be more quickly returned to the Kennedy Space Center after splashdown.

== Flights ==
Mission	Patch	Launch date (UTC)	Duration	Landing date (UTC)	Notes	Outcome
CRS-22		June 3, 2021; 17:29:15	36 days	July 10, 2021; 03:29	Second time Dragon 2 was used for a CRS mission, Second launch of phase 2 of CRS missions, Second time a Cargo Dragon and Crew Dragon were docked to the ISS at the same time.	Success
CRS-24		December 21, 2021; 10:07:08	34 days	January 24, 2022; 21:05		Success
CRS-27		15 March 2023 00:30	31 days	April 15, 2023, 20:58 UTC		Success
CRS-30		21 March 2024 20:55	39 days	30 April 2024 05:38		Success
CRS-32		21 April 2025 08:15	33 days	25 May 2025 05:44		Success
CRS-34		15 May 2026 22:05	32 days	17 June 2026 12:11		Success

== See also ==
- SpaceX Crew-2
- Boeing CST-100 Starliner
- Cargo Dragon C208
- Cargo Dragon C211
