= White Sands Space Harbor =

NASA training and research site

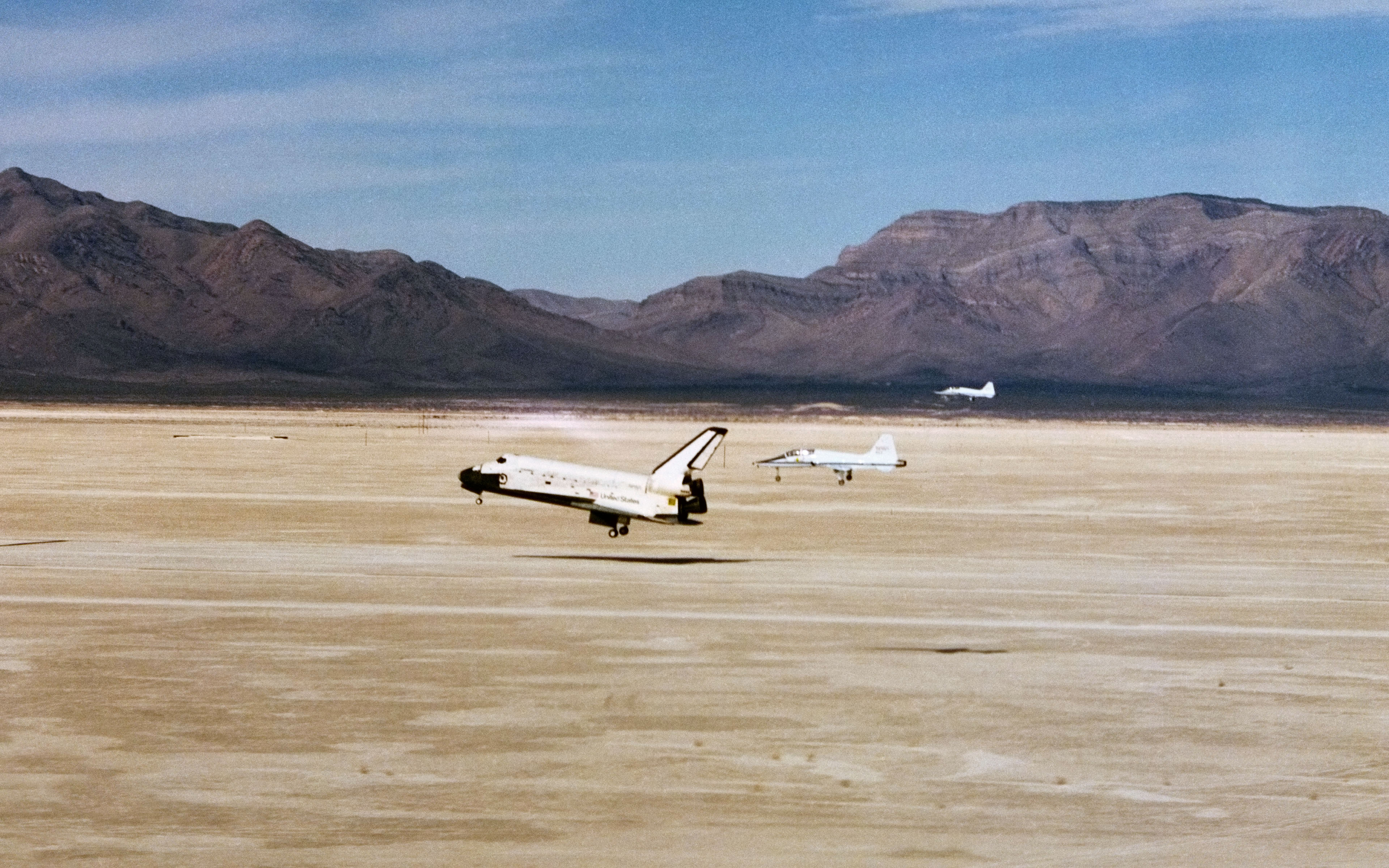
- IATA: none; ICAO: WSSH

Summary
- Airport type: Military
- Owner: US Air Force
- Operator: NASA
- Serves: White Sands Test Facility
- Location: White Sands Missile Range
- Elevation AMSL: 3,913 ft / 1,192 m
- Coordinates: 32°56′35.67″N 106°25′10.31″W

Map
- Location in New Mexico

Runways
Direction	Length		Surface
Direction	ft	m	Surface
17/35	35,000	10,700	Dry lakebed
5/23	35,000	10,700	Dry lakebed
2/20	12,800	3,900	Dry lakebed

White Sands Space Harbor (WSSH) is a spaceport in New Mexico that was formerly used as a Space Shuttle runway, a test site for rocket research, and the primary training area used by NASA for Space Shuttle orbiter pilots practicing approaches and landings in the Shuttle Training Aircraft and T-38 Talon aircraft. With its runways, navigational aids, runway lighting, and control facilities, it also served as a backup Shuttle landing site. WSSH is a part of the White Sands Test Facility, and is located approximately 30 miles (50 kilometers) west of Alamogordo, New Mexico, within the boundaries of the White Sands Missile Range.

== Runway facilities ==
In 1976, NASA selected Northrup Strip as the site for shuttle pilot training. A second runway was added crossing the original north-south landing strip, and in 1979 both lakebed runways were lengthened to 35,000 ft (10,668 m), which includes 15,000 ft (4,572 m) usable runway with 10,000 ft (3048 m) extensions on either end, to allow White Sands Space Harbor to serve as shuttle backup landing facility. While the Space Harbor was activated as a backup landing site for STS-116 due to poor weather conditions at both Edwards Air Force Base (high cross-winds) and Kennedy Space Center (clouds and rain), White Sands was only used for one landing of the Space Shuttle, that of the Space Shuttle Columbia on March 30, 1982, for STS-3.

Boeing's Starliner Calypso returned from a 49-hour Orbital Test Flight at 12:57 UTC on December 22, 2019. This marked only the second time an orbital vehicle has returned to Earth at White Sands.

== Launch complex ==
The McDonnell Douglas DC-X of the USAF Single Stage Rocket Technology (SSRT) program was launched 1993-1996 at the harbor.

== Landing history ==
No.	Date	Flight	Spacecraft	Landing site	Result
1	30 March 1982	STS-3	Space Shuttle Columbia	Runway 17	Success
2	22 December 2019	Boeing Orbital Flight Test	Boeing Starliner Calypso		Success
3	25 May 2022	Boeing Orbital Flight Test 2	Boeing Starliner Spacecraft 2		Success
4	7 September 2024	Boeing Crew Flight Test	Boeing Starliner Calypso		Success
