= Boeing Pad Abort Test =

Abort test of the Boeing Starliner spacecraft

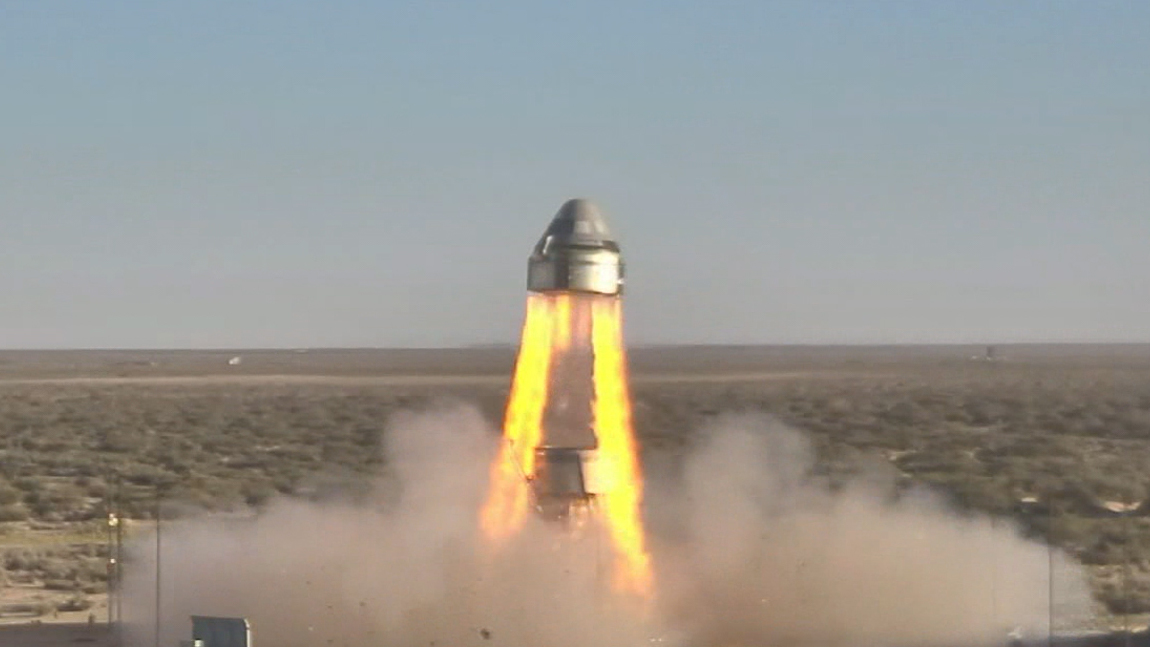
- Starliner Spacecraft 1 fires its RS-88 abort motors
- Names: Boe-PAT
- Mission type: Technology demonstration
- Operator: Boeing Defense, Space & Security
- Mission duration: 1 minute, 19 seconds

Spacecraft properties
- Spacecraft: Boeing Starliner Spacecraft 1
- Spacecraft type: Boeing Starliner
- Manufacturer: Boeing Defense, Space & Security

Start of mission
- Launch date: 4 November 2019, 14:15:00 UTC
- Launch site: White Sands Missile Range

End of mission
- Landing date: 4 November 2019, 14:16:19 UTC
- Landing site: White Sands Missile Range
- Commercial Crew Development Boeing Starliner flights

The Boeing Pad Abort Test (also abbreviated to Boe-PAT) was a test of the Boeing CST-100 Starliner and its abort motors, conducted by Boeing as part of NASA's Commercial Crew Program. It was the first flight of Starliner and one of the last milestones ahead of OFT. The mission's main objective was to demonstrate that Starliner could safely pull a crew away from the pad in the event of an emergency prior to liftoff.

After a successful launch, only two of three main parachutes deployed. Despite this, NASA and Boeing deemed the test a success, as Starliner was designed to function on two parachutes if necessary.

== History ==
In September 2011, Boeing announced the completion of a set of ground drop tests to validate the design of the airbag cushioning system. In May 2019, all major hotfire tests, were completed using full-up flight-capable service module hardware. This cleared the way for the pad abort test and the subsequent uncrewed and crewed flights.

The pad abort test took place on 4 November 2019. The abort motors fired nominally, followed by a clean service module separation. One of the three parachutes failed to deploy, and the capsule landed with only two parachutes. The airbag cushion helped break the harder-than-expected fall, and the landing was deemed to be safe. NASA declared the test a success, and the malfunction of one parachute didn't affect the Starliner development schedule. The malfunction was found to be human error. A pin meant to connect the pilot chute to the main chute was not properly connected. Therefore, the pilot chute was not able to successfully deploy the main chute. Pre-flight inspections did not catch this error due to a protective covering.

== See also ==
- Dragon 2 Pad Abort Test
