= Boeing Starliner-1 =

Planned cargo mission of the Boeing Starliner

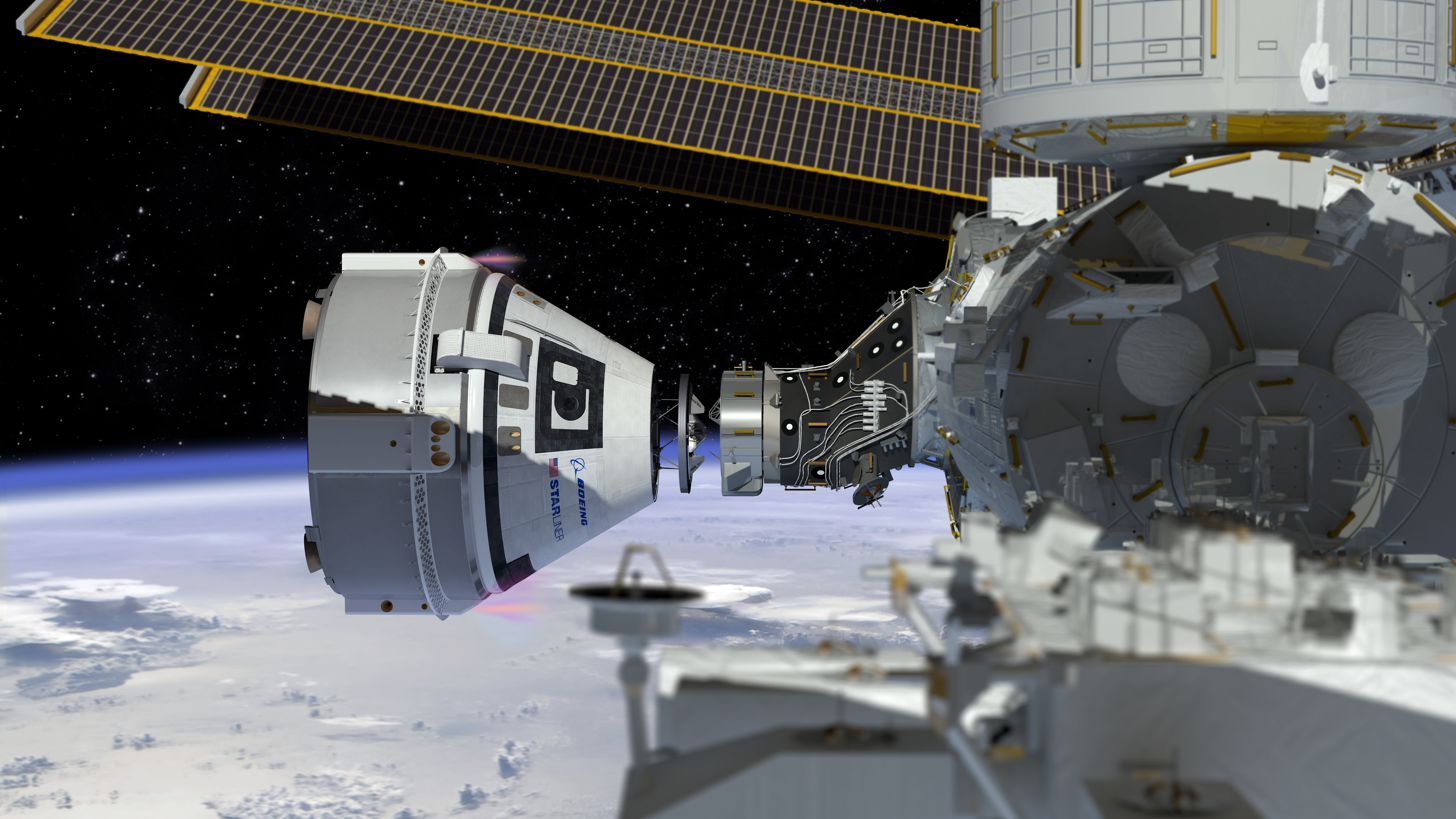
- Artist's impression of a Boeing Starliner docking to the ISS
- Mission type: ISS crew transport
- Operator: Boeing Defense, Space & Security

Spacecraft properties
- Spacecraft: Boeing Starliner Spacecraft 2
- Spacecraft type: Boeing Starliner
- Manufacturer: Boeing Defense, Space & Security
- Launch mass: 13,000 kg (29,000 lb)

Start of mission
- Launch date: NET January 14, 2027
- Rocket: Atlas V N22 (Note: N22 designates that the Atlas V has no payload fairing, two solid rocket boosters, and a dual engine Centaur second-stage.)
- Launch site: Cape Canaveral, SLC-41
- Contractor: United Launch Alliance (Note: Boeing owns a 50% stake in ULA. Lockheed Martin owns the other 50%.)

End of mission
- Landing site: TBD (Note: Potential landing locations include two sites inside the White Sands Missile Range in New Mexico, the Willcox Playa in Arizona, the Dugway Proving Ground in Utah, and Edwards Air Force Base in California.)

Orbital parameters
- Reference system: Geocentric orbit
- Regime: Low Earth orbit
- Inclination: 51.66°

Docking with ISS
- Docking port: Harmony forward or zenith
- Boeing Starliner flights

Boeing Starliner-1 is a planned cargo mission of the Boeing Starliner to the International Space Station (ISS) under NASA's Commercial Crew Program. It was to be the first operational crewed mission following the Boeing Crew Flight Test (CFT). After the CFT mission encountered significant technical issues, NASA and Boeing restructured the program, and Starliner-1 will now fly as an uncrewed cargo mission. As of November 2026, teams continue to work through the technical problems, and NASA is considering appropriate launch opportunities for the Starliner-1 mission. The flight is scheduled for no earlier than January 2027.

== Cancelled crew assignments ==
Starliner-1 was originally manifested as a crewed ISS rotation flight with several astronauts assigned and later reassigned due to program delays. In April 2022, NASA announced that it had not finalized crew placements among the Starliner astronaut cadre, including Barry Wilmore, Michael Fincke, and Sunita Williams. Williams and Wilmore were later assigned to the crewed CFT mission.

On September 30, 2022, Scott D. Tingle was named commander and Fincke as pilot. Fincke had previously served as a backup for CFT. On November 22, 2023, Joshua Kutryk was assigned as a mission specialist by the Canadian Space Agency. Kimiya Yui of JAXA was expected to occupy the remaining seat.

Multiple crew changes followed as delays accumulated. Williams, initially planned for Starliner-1, was reassigned to CFT. Jeanette Epps was added to Starliner-1 in 2020, but moved to SpaceX Crew-8 in 2023. Koichi Wakata joined the mission in May 2021, then transferred to SpaceX Crew-5 later that year.

On March 27, 2025, Fincke and Yui were reassigned to SpaceX Crew-11, and on November 4, 2025, Tingle became Chief of the Astronaut Office. On November 24, 2025, NASA announced that Starliner-1 would fly uncrewed, and on April 23, 2026, Kutryk was reassigned to SpaceX Crew-13. The first crew rotation mission is now expected to be Boeing Starliner-2 if certification is achieved.

== Mission ==
Starliner-1 was expected to mark the first reuse of a Starliner spacecraft. The vehicle initially chosen was the capsule flown on the first uncrewed Boeing Orbital Flight Test in December 2019 and later named Calypso by Sunita Williams. After Calypso was reassigned to the crewed CFT mission, Boeing Starliner Spacecraft 2, which flew on Boeing Orbital Flight Test 2, was designated for Starliner-1.

The CFT mission revealed several technical issues, including concerns about the spacecraft's ability to safely return astronauts to Earth. NASA stated that a second crewed test flight may be required, which would further delay the first operational crewed flight.

In July 2025, Steve Stich, program manager for NASA's Commercial Crew Program, said the next Starliner flight would likely be an uncrewed cargo mission while engineers continued work on oxidizer-valve temperature-control issues that prevented reliable engine pulsing. Stich said NASA remained optimistic that a crewed Starliner flight could occur on the program's second available slot in late 2026.

However, an investigation report released in February 2026 retroactively classified the CFT as a Type A mishap, NASA's most severe failure category, typically reserved for missions involving loss of vehicle or life. The report cited hardware failures, qualification deficiencies, leadership errors, and organizational shortcomings that created risks inconsistent with NASA's human spaceflight safety standards. Administrator Jared Isaacman said that while the spacecraft has design and engineering deficiencies requiring correction, he was most troubled by the failures in decision-making and leadership at both NASA and Boeing. Steve Stich reported that the investigation was still ongoing and that Starliner-1 would not fly until the investigation was completed and any needed mitigations could be implemented.

On May 2, 2026, NASA confirmed that Starliner-1 will act as an ISS resupply mission.

During a public meeting of NASA's Aerospace Safety Advisory Panel (ASAP) on June 23, 2026, a NASA participant stated that six anomalies remain under investigation, including the overheating of thrusters in the "doghouses", and the flight may be up to a year away.

At a July 30, 2026, NASA briefing on upcoming ISS spacewalks, Bill Spetch, deputy manager of NASA's Commercial Low Earth Orbit Program, said the agency was working "very closely" with Boeing to resolve the propulsion system issues identified during CFT, describing progress as good but declining to give a launch date. Boeing president and chief executive Kelly Ortberg said on a July 28 earnings call that Starliner work was going well and that the primary remaining issue was scheduling the mission with NASA; Boeing separately disclosed in a filing with the U.S. Securities and Exchange Commission that it was targeting no earlier than the fourth quarter of 2026 for Starliner-1. The mission was nonetheless absent from a list of missions Spetch described as a "busy fall and winter" for the ISS, which included SpaceX Crew-13 in October, the SpaceX CRS-35 cargo mission, and Northrop Grumman's Cygnus NG-25 cargo flight near the end of the year. Spetch said NASA would fly Starliner-1 "when it's ready to go and when we have a spot for it on ISS." A successful Starliner-1 flight by the beginning of 2027 would open the door to the spacecraft's first long-duration crew rotation mission in 2028, though with NASA still planning to retire the ISS in 2030, time remains limited to complete the four missions left on Boeing's modified Commercial Crew contract.
