= White Sands Test Facility =

U.S. rocket engine test facility in New Mexico

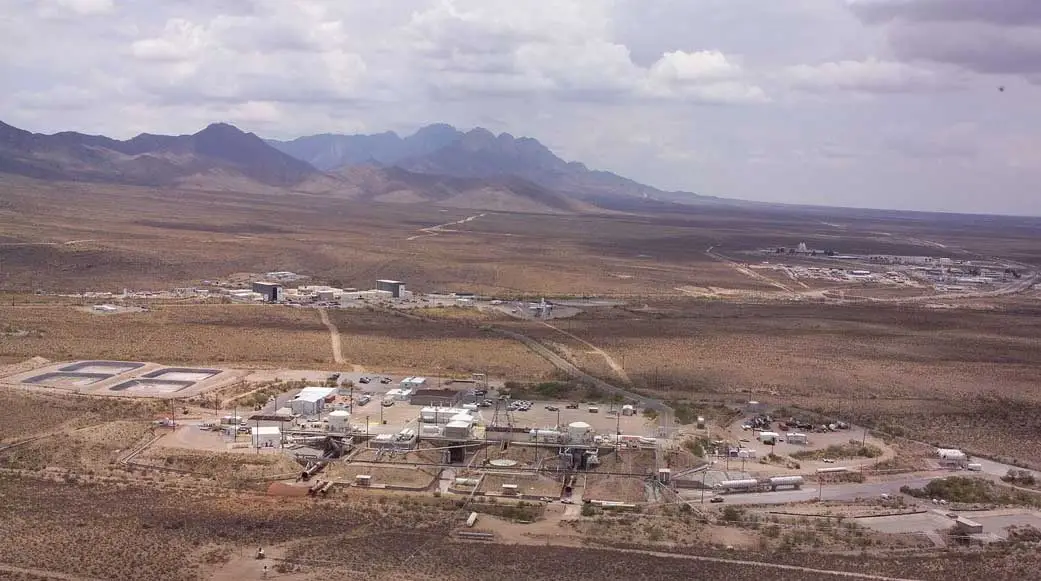
- Aerial view of the White Sands Test Facility in New Mexico

Agency overview
- Formed: July 6, 1963; 63 years ago
- Jurisdiction: Federal government of the United States
- Headquarters: Las Cruces, New Mexico, United States; 32.507°N 106.611°W
- Employees: 463 civil servants and contractors (2024)
- Annual budget: US$87 million (2024)
- Agency executive: Jason Noble, director
- Parent agency: Johnson Space Center (NASA)
- Website: nasa.gov/white-sands-test-facility

White Sands Test Facility (WSTF) is a NASA rocket engine test facility and a resource for testing and evaluating potentially hazardous materials, space flight components, and rocket propulsion systems. NASA established WSTF on the White Sands Missile Range in 1963. WSTF services are available to NASA, the United States Department of Defense, other federal agencies, universities and commercial industry. WSTF is managed by the Lyndon B. Johnson Space Center. WSTF is located in the western foothills of the Organ Mountains, eleven miles east of Las Cruces, New Mexico.

== Activities and facilities ==
=== Rocket propulsion ===
The primary mission of WSTF is to support NASA's Space Station program, and previously the Space Shuttle. As the official Johnson Space Center (JSC) Propulsion Systems Development Facility, WSTF participates in propulsion systems testing, with test expertise in hypergolic and mono-propellant handling and training. During the orbiter's life WSTF also managed and operated the Shuttle Fleet Leader program which consisted of testing orbital maneuvering and reaction control (thruster) subsystems.WSTF Propulsion

White Sands Test Facility offers numerous ambient pressure and altitude simulation stands to test rocket propulsion test systems as well as single rocket engines.

- Altitude Testing: The WSTF Large Altitude Simulation System provides altitude conditions equivalent up to 122,000 feet (37 km).
- Ambient Testing
- Fleet Leader Testing
- Unique Propulsion Test Expertise

=== Laboratories ===
WSTF performs testing designed to better understand materials used in space flight. WSTF Laboratories

- Oxygen Systems
- Propellant Systems
- Hypervelocity Impact Testing
- Composite Overwrapped Pressure Vessels (COPV)
- Standard Materials Testing

=== Hardware processing ===
The mission of the Hardware Processing Office is to provide the expertise to develop ground support equipment with the highest regard for safety and customer satisfaction. WSTF Hardware Processing

- Flight and Critical Hardware and Depot Processing
- Component Services
- Fabrication Services
- Measurement Standards and Calibration Laboratory
- Photo / Video Services
- Technical Publication Services

=== White Sands Space Harbor ===
WSTF formerly operated the White Sands Space Harbor (WSSH), which was the primary training area for Space Shuttle pilots, before the WSSH was closed in the wake of the Space Shuttle retirement. WSSH

=== Chemical and physical properties of materials ===
The engineers, chemists, and scientists in WSTF laboratories conduct testing of hazardous materials and propellants, air quality, aerospace hardware and ground support equipment, and all materials used in space flight. Standard Testing for DOT, ASTM and NASA, as well as ignition and flammability testing is routinely performed.

=== Hazards assessment ===
WSTF laboratory facilities conduct hazardous fluid assessment, hypervelocity tests, and explosive hazard assessment. The High Energy Blast Facility performs explosive testing with solid, cryogenic, hypergolic propellants, and other high explosives.

=== Oxygen systems ===
Oxygen compatibility is a critical issue in space, aircraft, medical, and industrial applications. At WSTF, researchers investigate the effects of increased oxygen concentration on the ignition and burning of materials and components used in these applications. Hazards analyses are performed on materials, components, and systems; and failure analyses determine the cause of fires. Training courses about the design and operation of safe oxygen systems are provided by WSTF personnel under the auspices of ASTM. WSTF NASA Oxygen Systems

=== Space flight hardware ===
The Propulsion Component Test Facility at WSTF is an International Space Station Depot Repair Facility. Flight hardware assembly, repair, and acceptance testing for private aerospace manufacturers are performed. WSTF refurbished hypergolic propellant components for the Space Shuttle, performed advanced pyrovalve testing at two laboratory facilities, and performed failure investigations. WSTF NASA Hardware Processing

== Health, safety, and environmental impact ==
Since the late 1990s, NASA and a series of subcontractors have been working under the oversight of the New Mexico Environment Department to remediate a large plume of polluted ground water caused by repeated leaks and spills of cleaning fluids and rocket propellants at the site. Remediation has involved the construction of six wells from which the groundwater is pumped; a UV reactor which treats the contaminated water; and four injection wells to inject the cleaned water back into the water table. A second, similar system is currently in the planning stage.

On May 24, 2024 at 7:50 a.m., a loose-fitting section of stainless steel oxidizer tubing at Test Stand 328 became pressurized, resulting in the accidental release of approximately 15 pounds of dinitrogen tetroxide vapor into the air. No impacts to worker safety were reported.
