= Boeing Starliner =

Class of partially reusable crew capsules

CST-100 Starliner
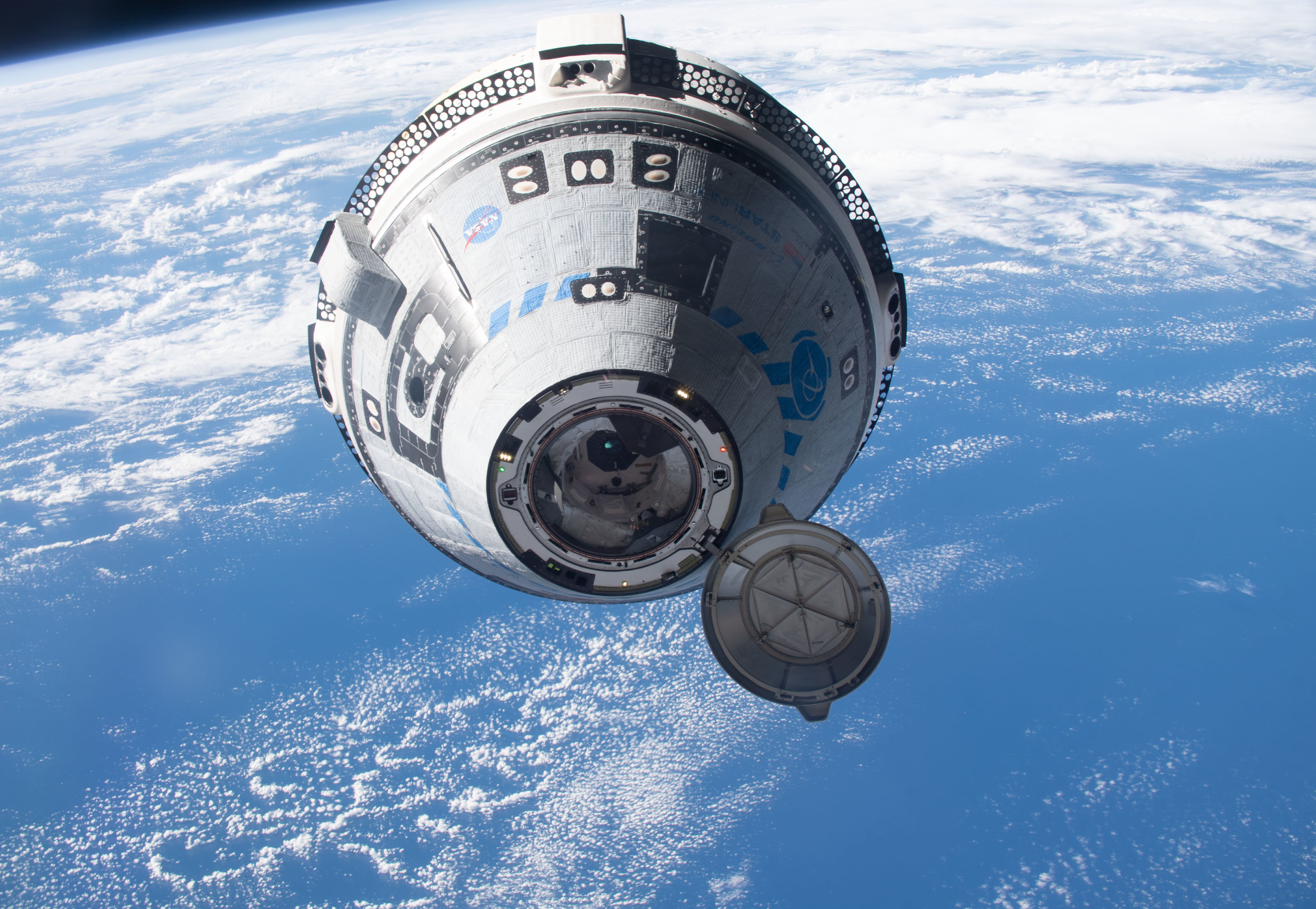
- Boeing Starliner Spacecraft 2 approaching the ISS in May 2022, during Orbital Flight Test 2
- Manufacturer: Boeing Defense, Space & Security
- Country of origin: United States
- Operator: Boeing Defense, Space & Security
- Applications: ISS crew transport
- Website: boeing.com/starliner

Specifications
- Spacecraft type: Capsule
- Payload capacity: To ISS: 4 crew and 100 kg (220 lb) cargo (Note: The first piloted Boeing Crew Flight Test mission carries 2 crew plus 344 kg (758 lb) of cargo.)
- Crew capacity: Up to 7
- Volume: 11 m^{3} (390 cu ft)
- Regime: Low Earth orbit
- Design life: 60 hours (free flight); 7 months (docked)

Dimensions
- Length: 5.03 m (16.5 ft) (Capsule and SM)
- Diameter: 4.56 m (15 ft)

Production
- Status: Active
- Built: 3
- Operational: 2
- Retired: 1
- Maiden launch: Uncrewed: December 20, 2019; Crewed: June 5, 2024

Related spacecraft
- Launch vehicle: Atlas V N22 (Note: N22 designates that the Atlas V has no payload fairing, two solid rocket boosters, and two Centaur second-stage engines.); Vulcan Centaur (future)

Configuration
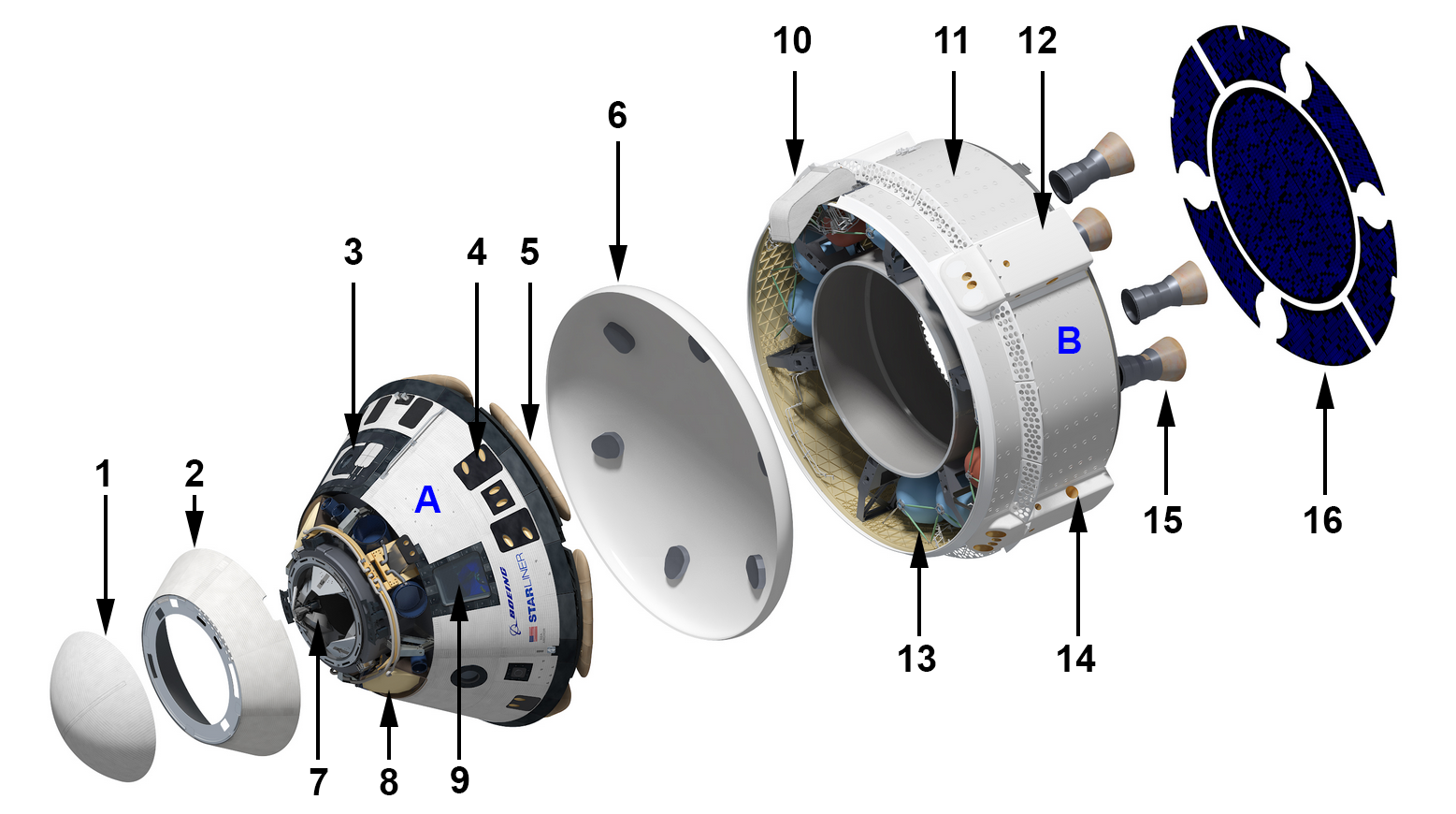
- Exploded view of the Starliner; A: Crew capsule, B: Service module 1: Nosecone, 2: Parachute compartment cover, 3: Crew access hatch, 4: RCS thrusters for re-entry, 5: Airbags, 6: Heat shield, 7: NASA Docking System, 8: Parachutes, 9: Window, 10: Umbilical, 11: Radiators, 12: "Doghouse" with RCS and OMAC thrusters, 13: Propellant tanks, 14: Roll control thruster, 15: RS-88 engines for launch escape, 16: Solar panels

The Boeing CST-100 (Note: CST is an initialism for Crew Space Transportation.) Starliner is a spacecraft designed to transport crew to and from the International Space Station (ISS) and other low-Earth-orbit destinations. Under development by Boeing under NASA's Commercial Crew Program (CCP), it consists of a reusable crew capsule and an expendable service module.

Slightly larger than the Apollo command module or SpaceX Crew Dragon, but smaller than the Orion capsule, the Starliner can accommodate a crew of up to seven, though NASA plans to fly no more than four. It can remain docked to the ISS for up to seven months and is launched on an Atlas V N22 rocket from Cape Canaveral Space Launch Complex 41 in Florida.

In 2014, NASA awarded Boeing a US$4.2 billion fixed-price contract to develop and operate Starliner, while SpaceX received $2.6 billion to develop and operate Crew Dragon. By February 2025, Boeing's effort had exceeded its budget by at least $2 billion.

Originally planned to be operational in 2017, Starliner has been repeatedly delayed by problems in management and engineering. The first uncrewed Orbital Flight Test in December 2019 was deemed a partial failure, leading to a second Orbital Flight Test in May 2022, which was also subsequently declared a partial failure.

In June 2024, during a Starliner Crew Flight Test, the capsule's thrusters malfunctioned on approach to the ISS, and NASA concluded that it was too risky to return its astronauts to Earth aboard the spacecraft. Thereafter, in September 2024, the capsule was returned uncrewed. The mission's astronauts, Sunita Williams and Barry Wilmore, eventually returned to Earth in March 2025 aboard a SpaceX Dragon capsule, which resulted in the Starliner mission being declared as a Type A mishap.

== Background ==
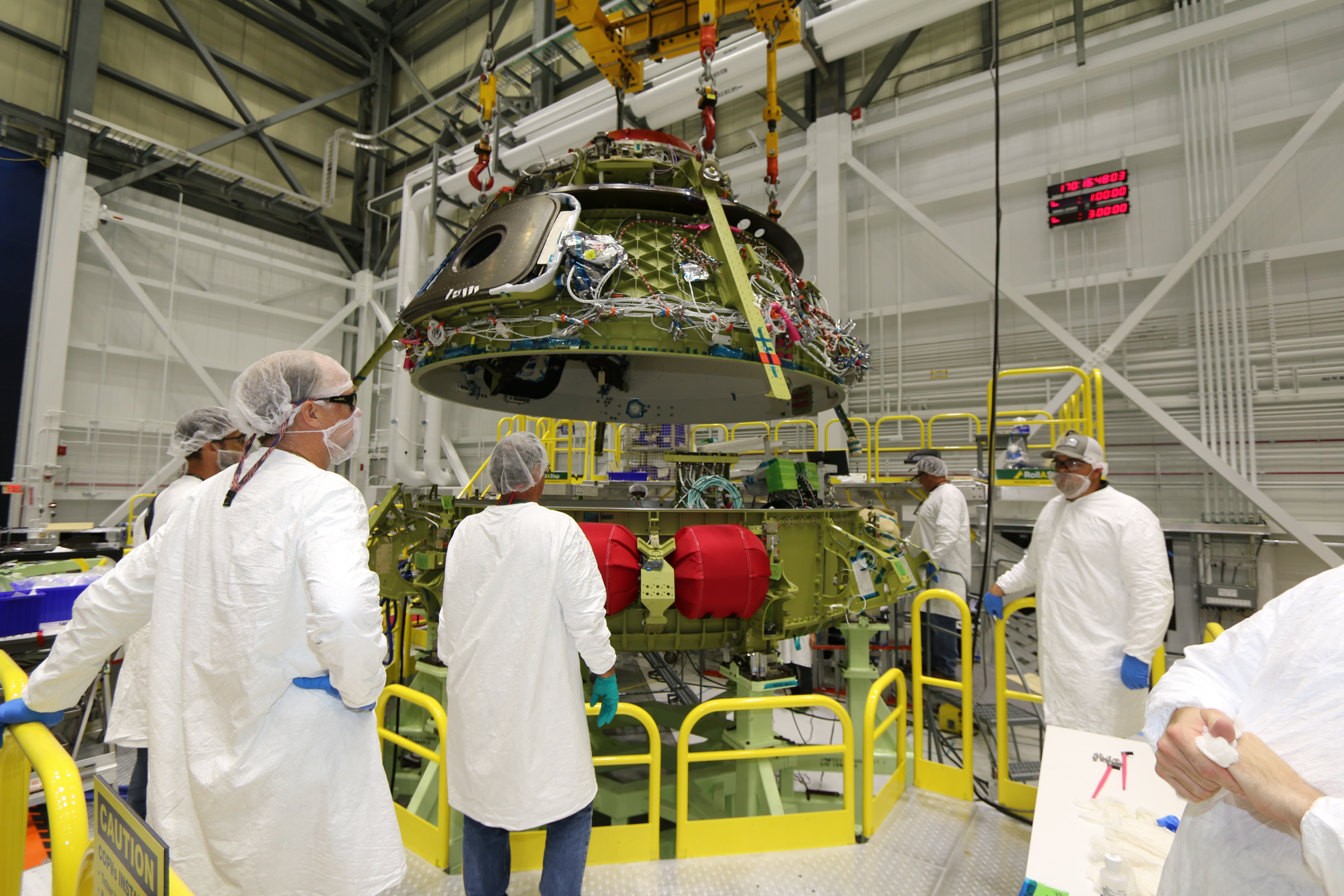
2018 Starliner assembly process

As the Space Shuttle program drew to a close, NASA sought to foster the development of new spaceflight capabilities. Departing from the traditional model of government-owned and operated spacecraft, NASA proposed a different approach: companies would own and operate spacecraft while NASA would act as a customer, purchasing flights as needed. NASA offered funding to support the development of these new vehicles, but unlike previous cost-plus contracts these new contracts would be fixed-price, placing the financial risk of cost overruns on the companies themselves.

Boeing had an extensive history of developing vehicles for space exploration, having built the first stage (S-IC) of the Saturn V rockets, assembling the Lunar Roving Vehicles, and serving as the prime contractor for the US Orbital Segment of the ISS since 1993. Hence, Boeing was suitable for the commercial spaceflight contracts.

In 2010, Boeing unveiled its entry into NASA's Commercial Crew Program competition: the CST-100. The company received initial funding of $18 million in the first round of the Commercial Crew Development (CCDev 1) program to support Starliner's development. Additionally, United Launch Alliance, a joint venture between Boeing and Lockheed Martin, secured $6.7 million to develop the Emergency Detection System to allow its Atlas V rocket to be human-rated to launch Starliner. At the time, Boeing expressed optimism that the Starliner could be operational as early as 2015, contingent upon timely approvals and funding.

In October 2011, NASA announced that the Orbiter Processing Facility-3 at Kennedy Space Center would be leased to Boeing for manufacture and test of Starliner, through a partnership with Space Florida.

Over the next three years, NASA held three more rounds of development funding, awarding Boeing $92.3 million under CCDev 2 in 2011, $460 million under the Commercial Crew integrated Capability (CCiCap) program in 2012, and $9.9 million under the Certification Products Contract (CPC) in 2013.

NASA was expected to announce its selection for the lucrative Commercial Crew Transportation Capability (CCtCap) contract in September 2014. Boeing had lobbied NASA for a sole-source contract, arguing that it needed the program's full budget for the successful development of Starliner. Within NASA, there was considerable support for this approach, with many decision-makers expressing confidence in Boeing's capabilities and safety record. In fact, NASA officials had even drafted a justification for selecting Boeing as the sole provider.

While William H. Gerstenmaier, NASA's human exploration lead, had considered the Starliner proposal as stronger, he was hesitant to award a sole-source contract. The multi-year Commercial Crew Program had been designed to foster competition and redundancy, and Gerstenmaier believed that selecting just one company would undermine these goals. Through his efforts, he successfully convinced NASA to delay the CCtCap announcement and secure additional funding to support two competing efforts.

On September 16, 2014, NASA announced that both Boeing and SpaceX would be awarded CCtCap contracts to develop crewed spacecraft. Boeing received a US$4.2 billion to complete and certify the Starliner, while SpaceX received a US$2.6 billion to complete and certify Crew Dragon. To receive the full contract amount, each company would need to successfully complete an abort test, an uncrewed orbital flight test, a crewed orbital flight test, and six crewed missions to the ISS. However, NASA would not need to pay for any failed tests and was only required to purchase two crewed missions to the ISS from each company. Following the initial guaranteed missions, the companies would compete for launch contracts on an ongoing basis.

In November 2015, NASA announced that it had dropped Boeing from consideration in the separate multibillion-dollar Commercial Resupply Services competition to fly cargo to the International Space Station.

== Development ==
Operational crewed orbital spacecraft as of 2025

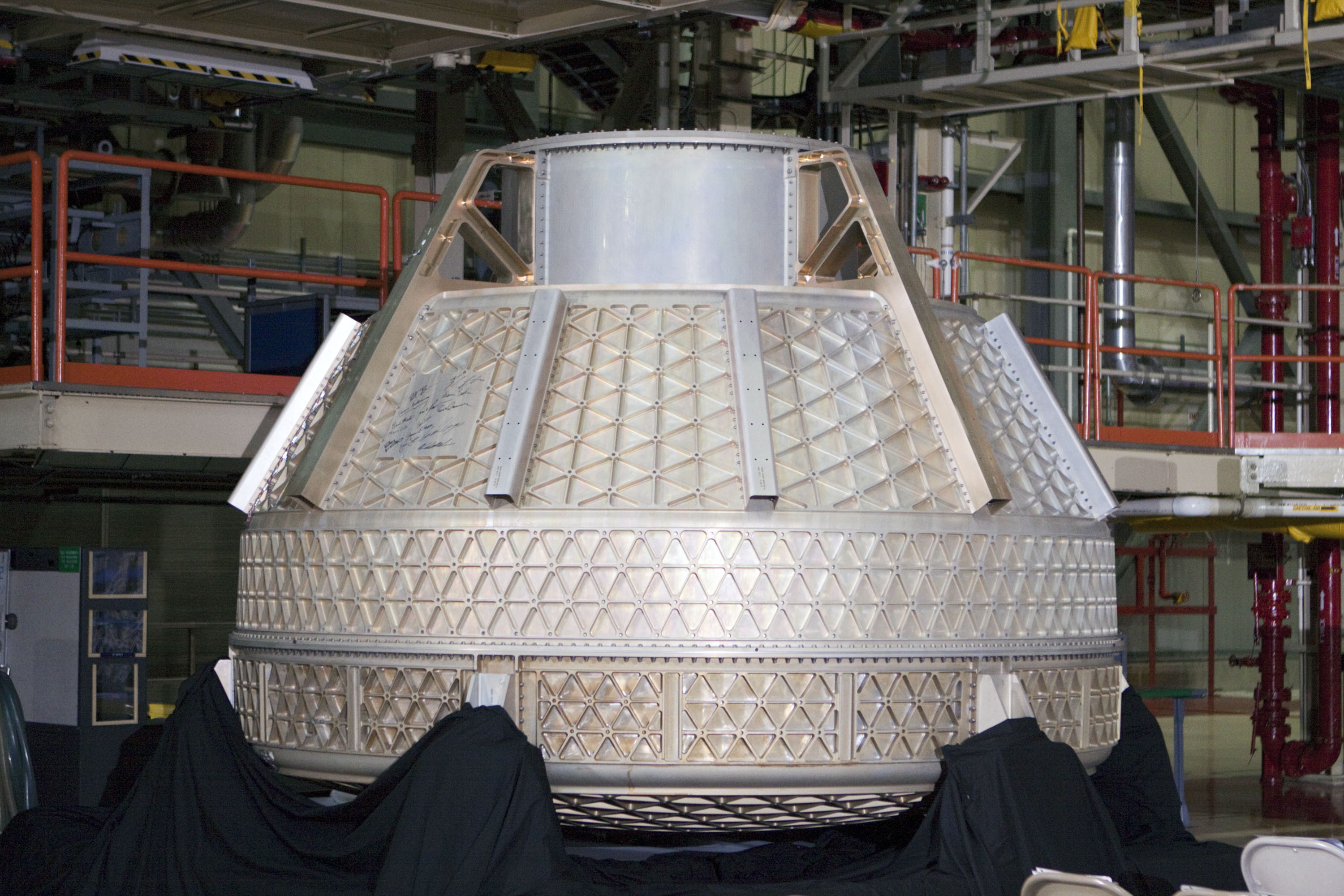
Starliner pressure vessel at the former Orbiter Processing Facility, showing its isogrid construction, October 2011

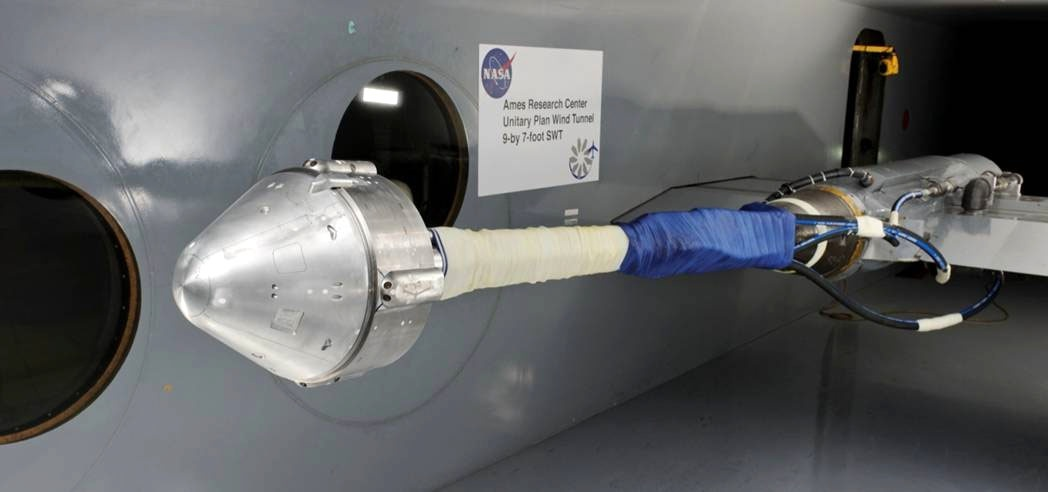
Wind-tunnel testing of Starliner model, December 2011

The name CST-100 was first used when the capsule was unveiled to the public in June 2010. The acronym "CST" stands for Crew Space Transportation, while the number "100" represents to the Kármán line, the unofficial boundary of space located at an altitude of 100 kilometers (62 mi) above Earth. The design draws upon Boeing's experience with NASA's Apollo, Space Shuttle, and ISS programs, as well as the Orbital Express project.

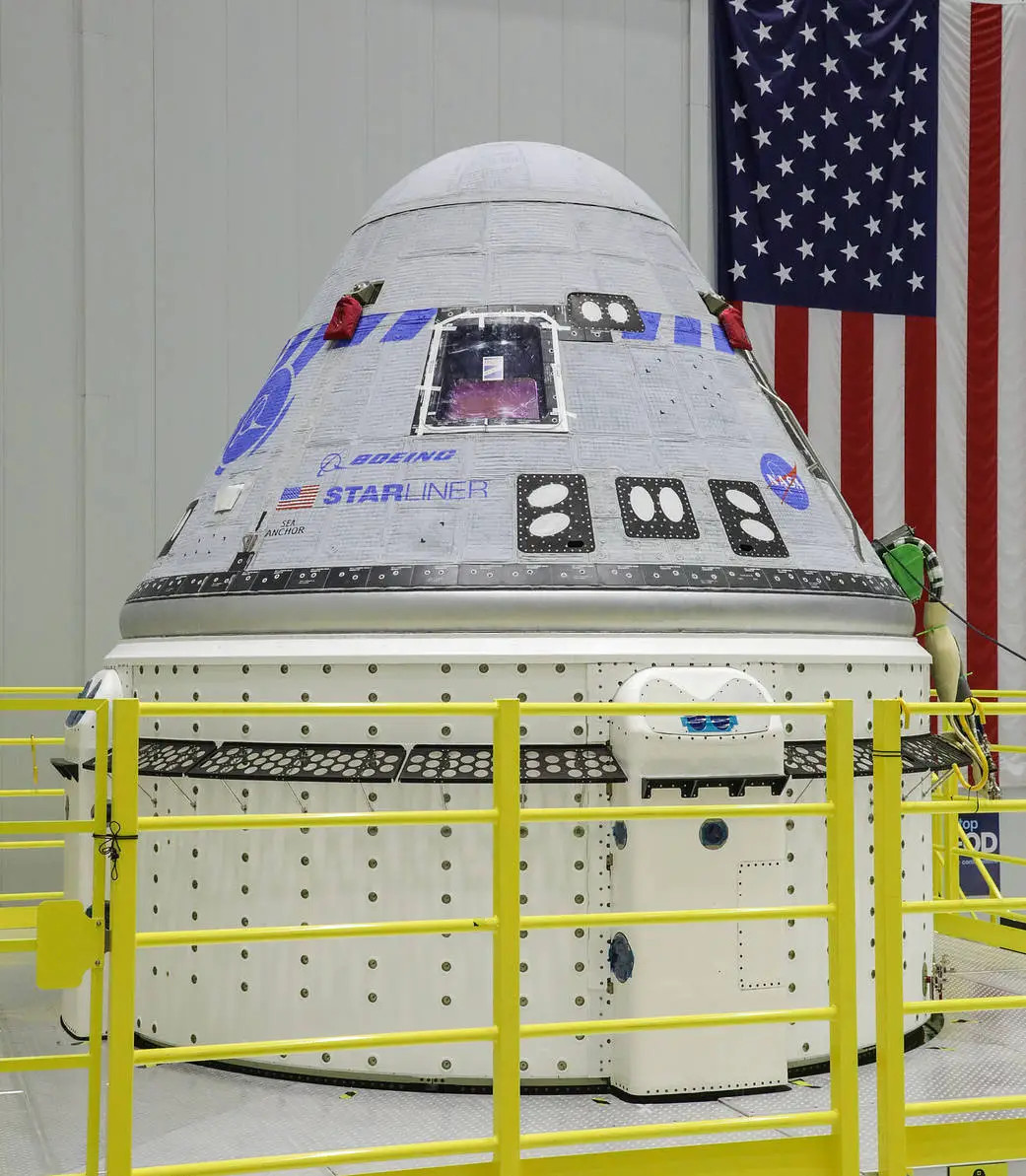
Starliner spacecraft consisting of capsule and service module

The spacecraft consists of a reusable capsule and an expendable service module and is designed for missions to low Earth orbit. The capsule accommodates seven passengers, or a mix of crew and cargo. For NASA missions to the ISS it will carry four passengers and a small amount of cargo. The Starliner capsule uses a weldless, spun-formed structure and is reusable up to ten times with a six-month turnaround time. Boeing plans to alternate between two reusable crew modules for all planned Starliner missions. Each flight uses a new service module, which provides propulsion and power-generation capacity for the spacecraft. Starliner features wireless Internet and tablet technology for crew interfaces.

Starliner uses the NASA Docking System. Boeing modified the Starliner design prior to OFT-2, adding a hinged re-entry cover below its expendable nosecone for additional protection of the docking port during atmospheric entry. This was tested on the OFT-2 mission. By contrast, the reusable SpaceX Dragon 2 nosecone is hinged and protects its docking port during both launch and reentry.

The capsule uses the Boeing Lightweight Ablator for its re-entry heat shield.

Solar cells provided by Boeing subsidiary Spectrolab are installed onto the aft face of the service module, providing 2.9 kW of electricity.

In addition to the capsule and service module, a 5.8 ft (1.78 m) structure called an aeroskirt is integrated into the launch vehicle adapter of Atlas V. The aeroskirt provides aerodynamic stability and dampens the shock waves that come from the front of the rocket.

The spacecraft's propulsion system is produced by Aerojet Rocketdyne and consists of 64 engines:

- 12 × 100 lbf (440 N) MR-104J RCS (reaction control system) thrusters on the capsule, using hydrazine monopropellant and reserved for orienting the capsule during atmospheric re-entry
- 52 on the service module using monomethylhydrazine and nitrogen tetroxide bipropellant:
  - 28 × 85 lbf (380 N) RCS thrusters on the service module for attitude control during the majority of the flight
  - 20 × 1,500 lbf (6,700 N) OMAC (orbital maneuvering and attitude control) thrusters for altering orbits
  - 4 × 40,000 lbf (180,000 N) RS-88 engines for launch escape capability in the event of an abort

The RCS and OMAC thrusters on the service module are grouped into four "doghouses" equally spaced around its perimeter. Each doghouse contains five OMAC thrusters (three aft-facing and two forward-facing) and seven RCS thrusters (two aft-facing, two forward-facing, one radial, and two tangential).

To move in a straight line, the spacecraft fires pairs of thrusters in a balanced way so that the push goes through its center of mass, allowing it to shift position without spinning. To turn or change its orientation, it fires thrusters in an unbalanced way, creating a twisting force (torque) that rotates the spacecraft without significantly changing its overall path. The RCS thrusters are used mainly for steering and precise docking maneuvers, while the OMAC thrusters provide the stronger thrust needed for larger changes in orbit.

Boeing designed the capsule to make ground landings instead of a splashdown, a first for a crewed capsule mission launched from the United States. After reentering the atmosphere, three parachutes are deployed, slowing the capsule to approximately 4 miles per hour (350 ft/min; 1.8 m/s). Before reaching the ground, six airbags deploy to cushion the landing. There are four primary landing locations, including two sites inside the White Sands Missile Range in New Mexico, the Willcox Playa in Arizona and the Dugway Proving Ground in Utah. Edwards Air Force Base in California serves as a contingency landing location. All of the landing sites are in the Western United States, allowing the service module to be jettisoned for a destructive reentry over the Pacific Ocean. Boeing says that between all five landing sites, there are around 450 landing opportunities each year.

Following the award of the Commercial Crew Transportation Capability (CCtCap) contract in 2014, NASA assigned a team of four experienced astronauts, Bob Behnken, Eric Boe, Doug Hurley, and Sunita Williams, to serve as consultants to engineers at both Boeing and SpaceX. These astronauts were also slated to be the test pilots on the inaugural missions. Hurley recounted a stark contrast in the working relationships between the astronauts and the engineers at the two companies. While the SpaceX engineers were receptive to feedback, enthusiastic about collaborating, and attentive to suggestions, Hurley found the Boeing engineers to be indifferent, arrogant, and overconfident. He also said the Boeing team failed to inform the astronauts about the propellant leak that occurred during the Pad Abort Test. Ultimately, Hurley told the chief of the astronaut office that he would not fly on Starliner. Hurley and Behnken later went on to command the Crew Dragon's historic Demo-2 mission, the first crewed flight of the spacecraft. Williams flew into space on the Boeing Crew Flight Test, but returned to Earth on a Crew Dragon, after thrusters malfunctioned on the Starliner.

Despite being awarded significantly more funding than Crew Dragon, Boeing faced substantial internal budget overruns for the Starliner program, exceeding $2 billion as of February 2025.

In November 2019, NASA's Office of Inspector General released a report revealing that a change to Boeing's contract had occurred in 2016, stating: "For Boeing's third through sixth crewed missions, we found that NASA agreed to pay an additional $287.2 million above Boeing's fixed prices to mitigate a perceived 18-month gap in ISS flights anticipated in 2019 and to ensure the contractor continued as a second commercial crew provider", and NASA and Boeing committed to six missions instead of the last four being optional.

=== Post Crew Flight Test ===
In August 2024, after the setbacks experienced during the Crew Flight Test, NASA administrator Bill Nelson stated that Boeing CEO Kelly Ortberg committed to continuing the Starliner program. However, financial analysts expressed skepticism that Boeing would continue to invest in a money-losing program, and in October The Wall Street Journal reported that Boeing was exploring a sale of some of its space division programs, including Starliner. But in March 2025, Commercial Crew Program manager Steve Stich stated that the next flight may happen in late 2025 or early 2026.

On July 10, 2025, Stich stated that the next Starliner flight would likely be an uncrewed cargo mission. Stich also elaborated on the main issues that Starliner was facing in its development, namely the oxidizer valves, more specifically, how the temperature controls required for effective pulses of fuel and oxidizer through these valves are not at a consistent level NASA deems acceptable. Stich stated that these valves were not designed to be opened and closed when the Starliner's RCS thrusters were also operating, as the RCS thrusters impacted the temperature in the valves and thus their ability to open and close. Stich stated that steady progress was being made, and concluded by saying NASA was optimistic that another crewed Starliner flight would take place for the second slot in the crew program in the later part of 2026.

On September 28, 2026, NASA and Boeing announced modifications to the spacecraft's service module intended to reduce temperatures. The modifications will be tested on the uncrewed Starliner-1 mission, which is expected to launch in December 2026 or January 2027. For the crewed Starliner-2 mission and subsequent flights, the service module's thruster valve design will be modified to address problems with the poppet seals identified during the Crew Flight Test mission. Other changes will include new crew module thrusters and batteries, along with modifications to the parachute system.

NASA also announced that Warren Hoburg would command Starliner-2. The assignment was made earlier than is typical for a NASA astronaut, allowing Hoburg to work with Boeing during implementation of the spacecraft modifications. Starliner-2 is expected to launch to the International Space Station in 2028 as part of a six-month crew rotation mission.

NASA also announced plans to exercise options for a fifth and sixth Starliner flight to and from the International Space Station. The agency will work with Boeing and United Launch Alliance to certify the Vulcan Centaur launch vehicle for Starliner missions following the final flight of the Atlas V. NASA agreed to provide $359 million to support modifications to the thruster systems and certification of Vulcan Centaur.

== Testing ==
Various validation tests began on test articles in 2011 and continued on actual spacecraft starting in 2019.

=== Abort and drop tests ===
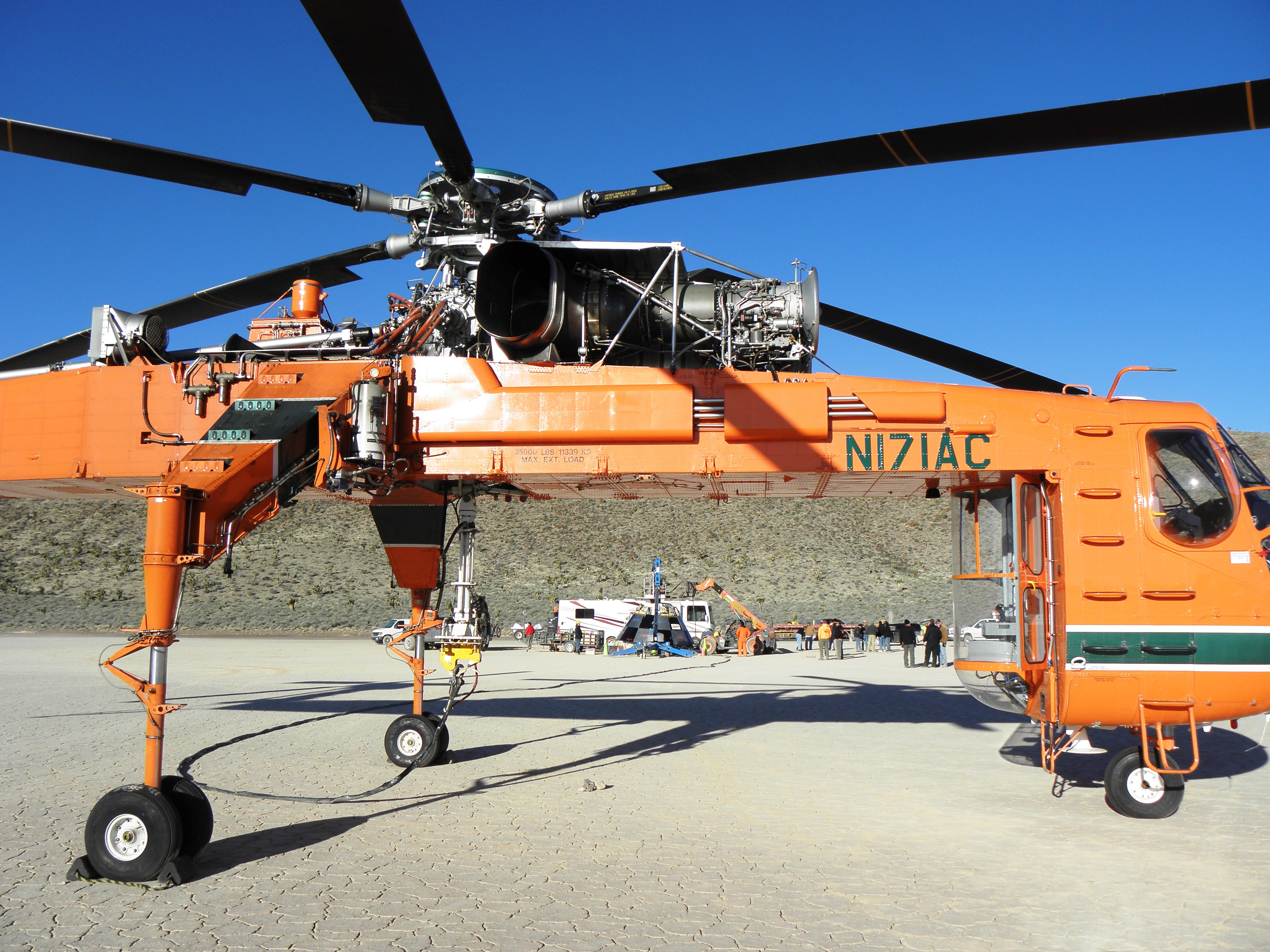
An Erickson Skycrane (foreground) frames the Starliner (background) in 2012. During testing, the helicopter dropped the capsule from about 7,000 feet (2,000 m) to test its parachutes and airbags.

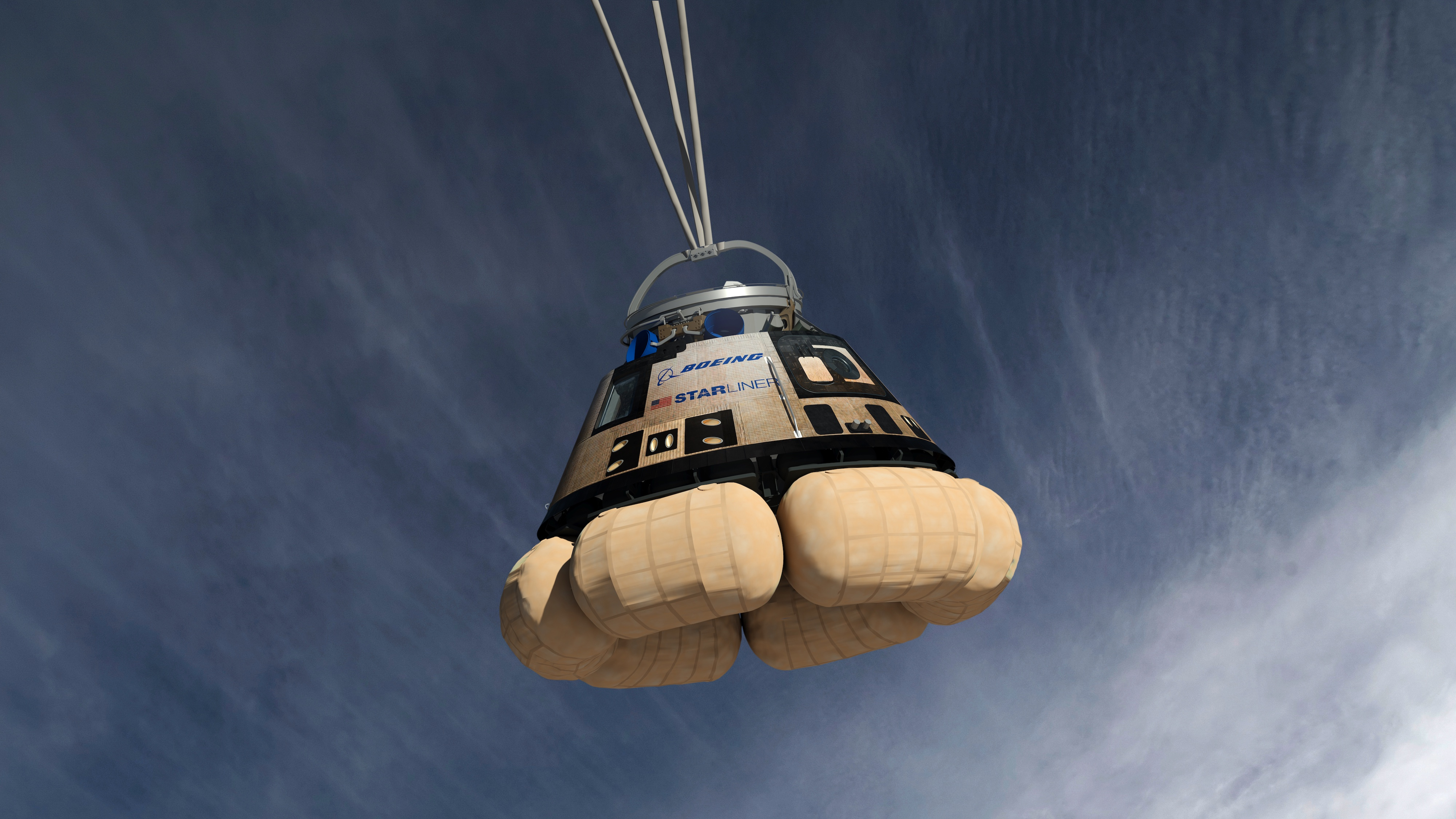
A close up of Starliner's six airbags during drop testing

In September 2011, Boeing announced the completion of a set of ground drop tests to validate the design of the airbag cushioning system. The airbags are located underneath the heat shield of the Starliner, which is designed to be separated from the capsule while under parachute descent at about 5,000 ft (1,500 m) altitude. The airbags, manufactured by ILC Dover, are deployed by filling with a mixture of compressed nitrogen and oxygen gas, not with the pyro-explosive mixture sometimes used in automotive airbags. The tests were carried out in the Mojave Desert of southeast California, at ground speeds between 10 and 30 mph (16 and 48 km/h) in order to simulate crosswind conditions at the time of landing. Bigelow Aerospace built the mobile test rig and conducted the tests.

In April 2012, Boeing dropped a mock-up of its Starliner over the Nevada desert at the Delamar Dry Lake, Nevada, successfully testing the craft's three main landing parachutes from 11,200 ft (3,400 m).

Boeing reported in May 2016 that its test schedule would slip by eight months in order to reduce the mass of the spacecraft, address aerodynamics issues anticipated during launch and ascent on the Atlas V rocket, and meet new NASA-imposed software requirements. The Orbital Flight Test was scheduled for spring 2019. The booster for this Orbital Flight Test, an Atlas V N22 rocket, was assembled at United Launch Alliance's (ULA) facility at Decatur, Alabama by the end of 2017. The first crewed flight (Boe-CFT) was scheduled for summer 2019, pending test results from Boe-OFT. It was planned to last 14 days and carry one NASA astronaut and one Boeing test pilot to the ISS. On April 5, 2018, NASA announced that the first planned two-person flight, originally slated for November 2018, was likely to occur in 2019 or 2020.

A serious incident occurred during a hot-fire test in June 2018. A design flaw in the propellant system left four of eight valves open, leading to the release of over 4,000 pounds (1,800 kg) of toxic monomethylhydrazine propellant, resulting in a fireball that engulfed the equipment. The incident was reportedly exacerbated by animosity with the propulsion system subcontractor, Aerojet Rocketdyne, who Boeing refused to pay for design changes. While it informed NASA of the incident, Boeing attempted to keep the incident quiet, even withholding information from the astronauts involved in the project.

In October 2018, the first unpiloted orbital mission was delayed to April 2019, and the first crew launch was rescheduled to August 2019. In March 2019, Reuters reported that these test flights had been delayed by at least three months, and in April 2019 Boeing announced that the unpiloted orbital mission was scheduled for August 2019.

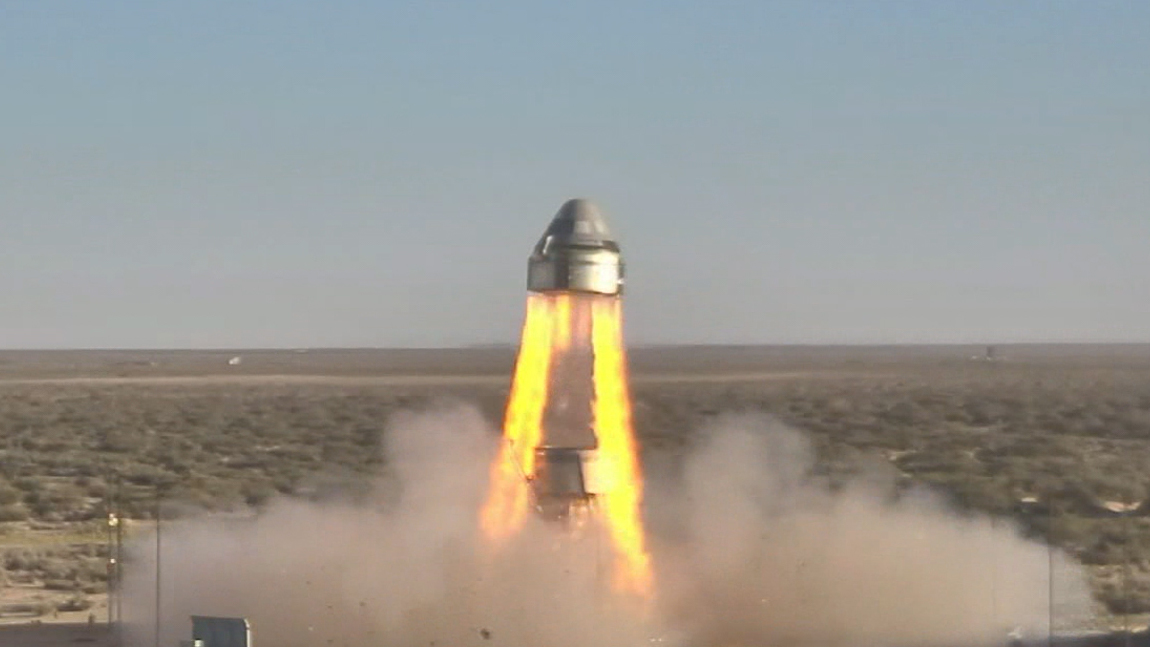
Starliner Spacecraft 1 ignites its RS-88 abort engines during the Boeing Pad Abort Test in November 2019.

In May 2019, all major hot-fire testing, including simulations of low-altitude abort-thruster testing, was completed using a full up-to-service module test article that was "flight-like," meaning that the service module test rig used in the hot-fire testing included fuel and helium tanks, reaction control system, orbital maneuvering, and attitude-control thrusters, launch abort engines and all necessary fuel lines and avionics that will be used for crewed missions. This cleared the way for the pad abort test and the subsequent uncrewed and crewed flights.

A pad abort test took place on November 4, 2019. The capsule accelerated away from its pad, but then one of the three parachutes failed to deploy, and the capsule landed with only two parachutes. Landing was, however, deemed safe, and the test a success. Boeing did not expect the malfunction of one parachute to affect the Starliner development schedule.

=== Orbital Flight Test ===
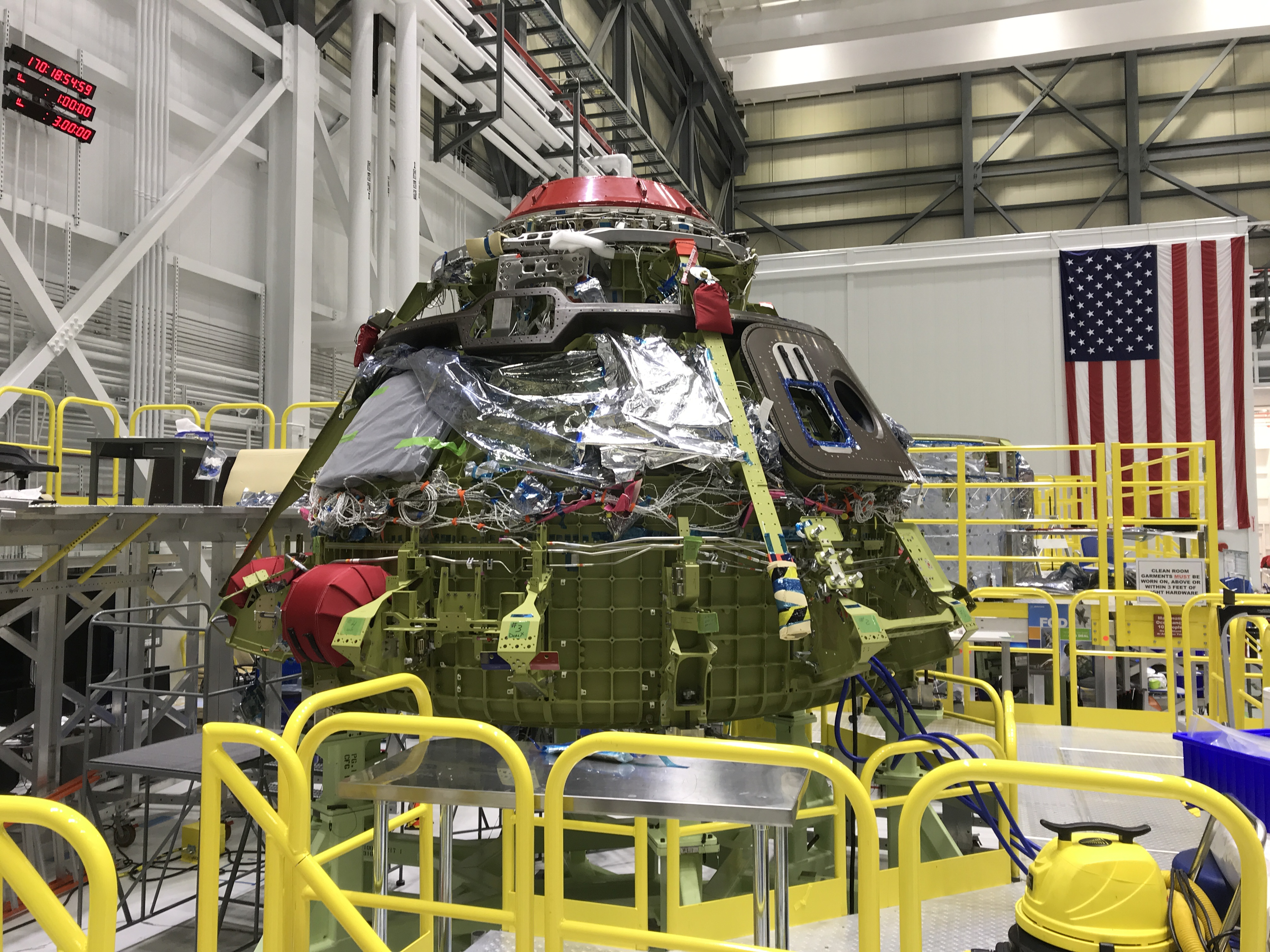
The upper and lower domes of Boeing Starliner Calypso being mated inside the Commercial Crew and Cargo Processing Facility (C3PF) at Kennedy Space Center on June 19, 2018

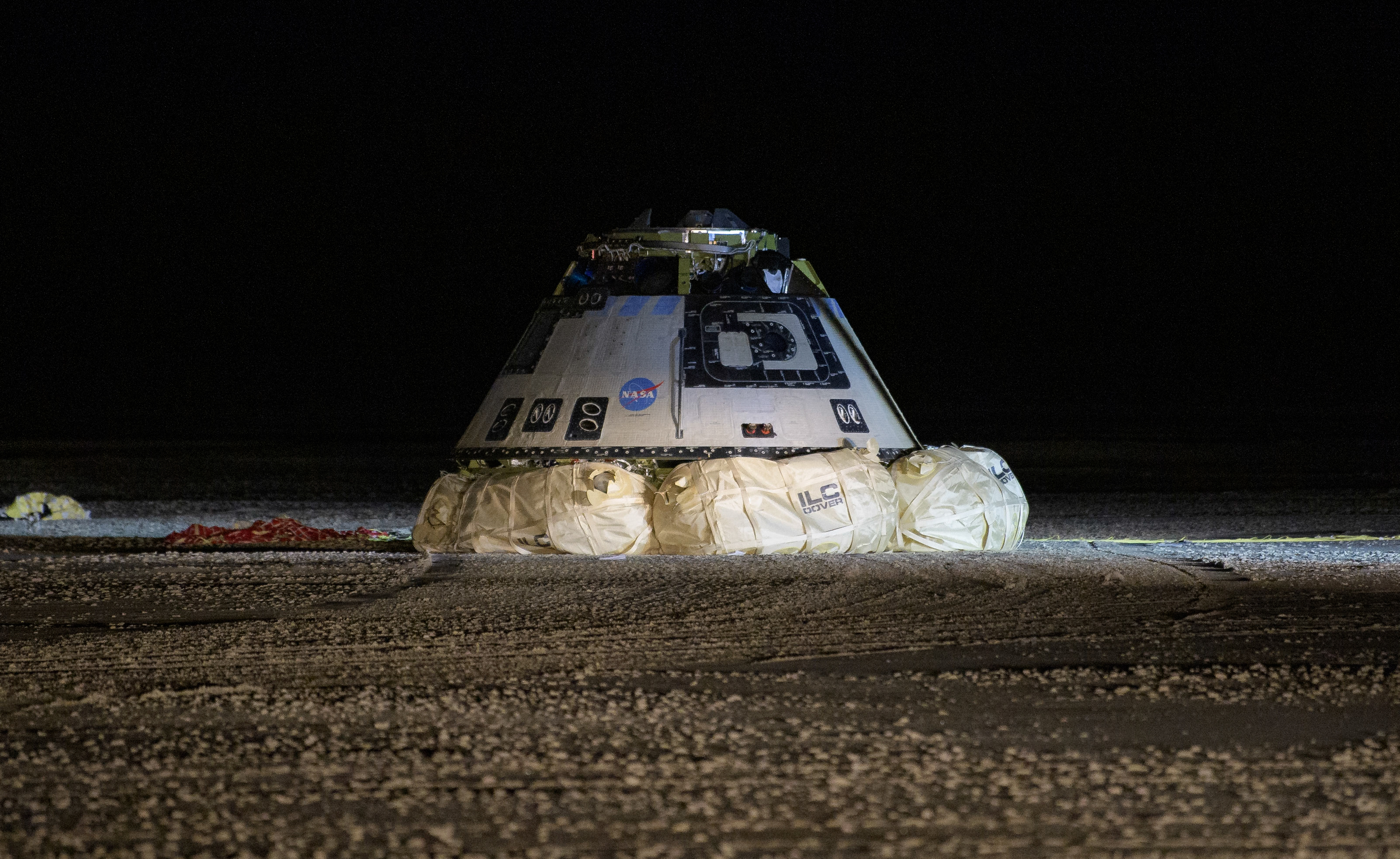
Boeing Starliner Calypso landed at White Sands Missile Range in New Mexico following an uncrewed Orbital Flight Test in December 2019.

The uncrewed Boeing Orbital Flight Test (OFT) launched on December 20, 2019, bearing an Anthropomorphic Test Device nicknamed "Rosie the Rocketeer" and clothed in Boeing's blue IVA spacesuit as well as a Plush toy of Snoopy. It landed two days later, having nearly ended in catastrophic failure. The mission was ultimately declared a partial failure.

After launch, the spacecraft captured a "mission elapsed time" from its Atlas V launch vehicle that was 11 hours off. Consequently, when the spacecraft separated from the rocket, instead of briefly firing its reaction control thrusters to enter orbit, its computers commanded them to fire for far longer, consuming so much fuel that the spacecraft no longer had enough to dock with the ISS. As the capsule was prepared for re-entry, another software error was discovered; it could have caused a catastrophic collision between the service module and crew capsule.

The spacecraft landed at White Sands Missile Range, New Mexico, two days after launch. After its landing, NASA astronaut Sunita Williams named the spacecraft Calypso after the research vessel RV Calypso used by oceanographic researcher Jacques Cousteau.

After the mission, Boeing vice president John Mulholland acknowledged that the company had not conducted integrated end-to-end tests for the entire mission, but had instead performed tests of smaller segments. This approach contributed to the software errors that led to the near-catastrophic failures during the flight test. Mulholland insisted that Boeing cut no corners, and that end-to-end tests were not omitted to save money. NASA was also faulted for not pressing Boeing to conduct an end-to-end test.

The subsequent NASA–Boeing investigation into the flight made scores of recommendations for Boeing and NASA. Boeing declared these to be proprietary, so the only ones publicly known are the ones that officials deliberately disclosed. In 2020, company officials said they were addressing 80 of the recommendations.

=== Orbital Flight Test 2 ===
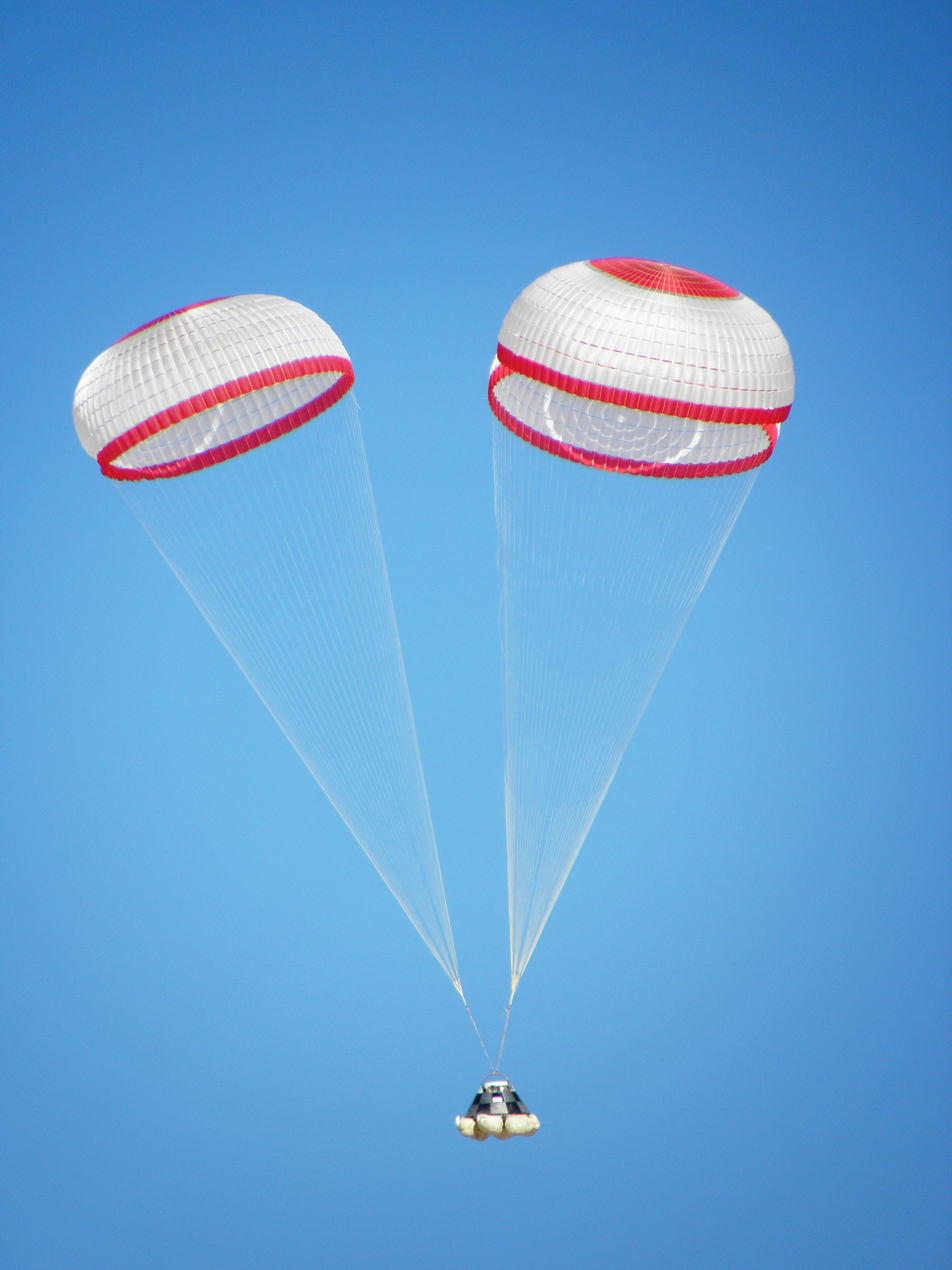
Boeing Starliner Spacecraft 2 ahead of landing at White Sands Missile Range in New Mexico following OFT-2 in May 2022

Because the first OFT did not achieve its objectives, Boeing officials said on April 6, 2020 that the Starliner crew capsule would fly a second uncrewed demonstration mission, Boeing Orbital Flight Test 2 (OFT-2), before flying astronauts. NASA said that it had accepted a recommendation from Boeing to fly a second unpiloted mission. The Washington Post reported that the second orbital flight test, with much the same objectives as the first, was expected to launch from Cape Canaveral "sometime in October or November 2020". Boeing said that it would fund the unplanned crew capsule test flight "at no cost to the taxpayer". Boeing told investors earlier in 2020 that it was taking a US$410 million charge against its earnings to cover the expected costs of a second unpiloted test flight. Boeing officials said on August 25, 2020 that they set the stage for the first Starliner demonstration mission with astronauts in mid-2021. Boeing modified the design of the Starliner docking system prior to OFT-2 to add a re-entry cover for additional protection during the capsule's fiery descent through the atmosphere. This re-entry cover is hinged, like the SpaceX design. Teams also installed the OFT-2 spacecraft's propellant heater, thermal-protection tiles, and the airbags used to cushion the capsule's landing. The crew module for the OFT-2 mission began acceptance testing in August 2020, which is designed to validate the spacecraft's systems before it is mated with its service module, according to NASA. On November 10, 2020, NASA's Commercial Crew Program manager Steve Stich said that the second orbital flight test would be delayed until first quarter 2021 due to software issues. The uncrewed test continued to slip, with the OFT-2 uncrewed test flight being scheduled for March 2021 and the crewed flight targeted for a launch the following summer. The launch date of OFT-2 moved again with the earliest estimated launch date set for August 2021.

During the August 2021 launch window some issues were detected with 13 propulsion-system valves in the spacecraft prior to launch. The spacecraft had already been mated to its launch rocket, United Launch Alliance's (ULA) Atlas V, and taken to the launchpad. Attempts to fix the problem while on the launchpad failed, and the rocket was returned to the ULA's VIF (Vertical Integration Facility). Attempts to fix the problem at the VIF also failed, and Boeing decided to return the spacecraft to the factory, thus cancelling the launch at that launch window. There was a commercial dispute between Boeing and Aerojet Rocketdyne over responsibility for fixing the problem. The valves had been corroded by intrusion of moisture, which interacted with the propellant, but the source of the moisture was not apparent. By late September 2021, Boeing had not determined the root cause of the problem, and the flight was delayed indefinitely. Through October 2021, NASA and Boeing continued to make progress and were "working toward launch opportunities in the first half of 2022", In December 2021, Boeing decided to replace the entire service module and anticipated OFT-2 to occur in May 2022.

The OFT-2 mission launched on May 19, 2022. It again carried Rosie the Rocketeer test dummy suited in the blue Boeing inflight spacesuit. Two Orbital Maneuvering and Attitude Control (OMAC) thrusters failed during the orbital insertion burn, but the spacecraft was able to compensate using the remaining OMAC thrusters with the addition of the Reaction Control System (RCS) thrusters. A couple of RCS thrusters used to maneuver Starliner also failed during docking due to low chamber pressure. Some thermal systems used to cool the spacecraft showed extra cold temperatures, requiring engineers to manage it during the docking.

On May 22, 2022, the capsule docked with the International Space Station. On May 25, 2022, the capsule returned from space and landed successfully. During reentry one of the navigation systems dropped communication with the GPS satellites, but Steve Stich, program manager for NASA's Commercial Crew Program, said this is not unexpected during reentry.

=== Crew Flight Test ===
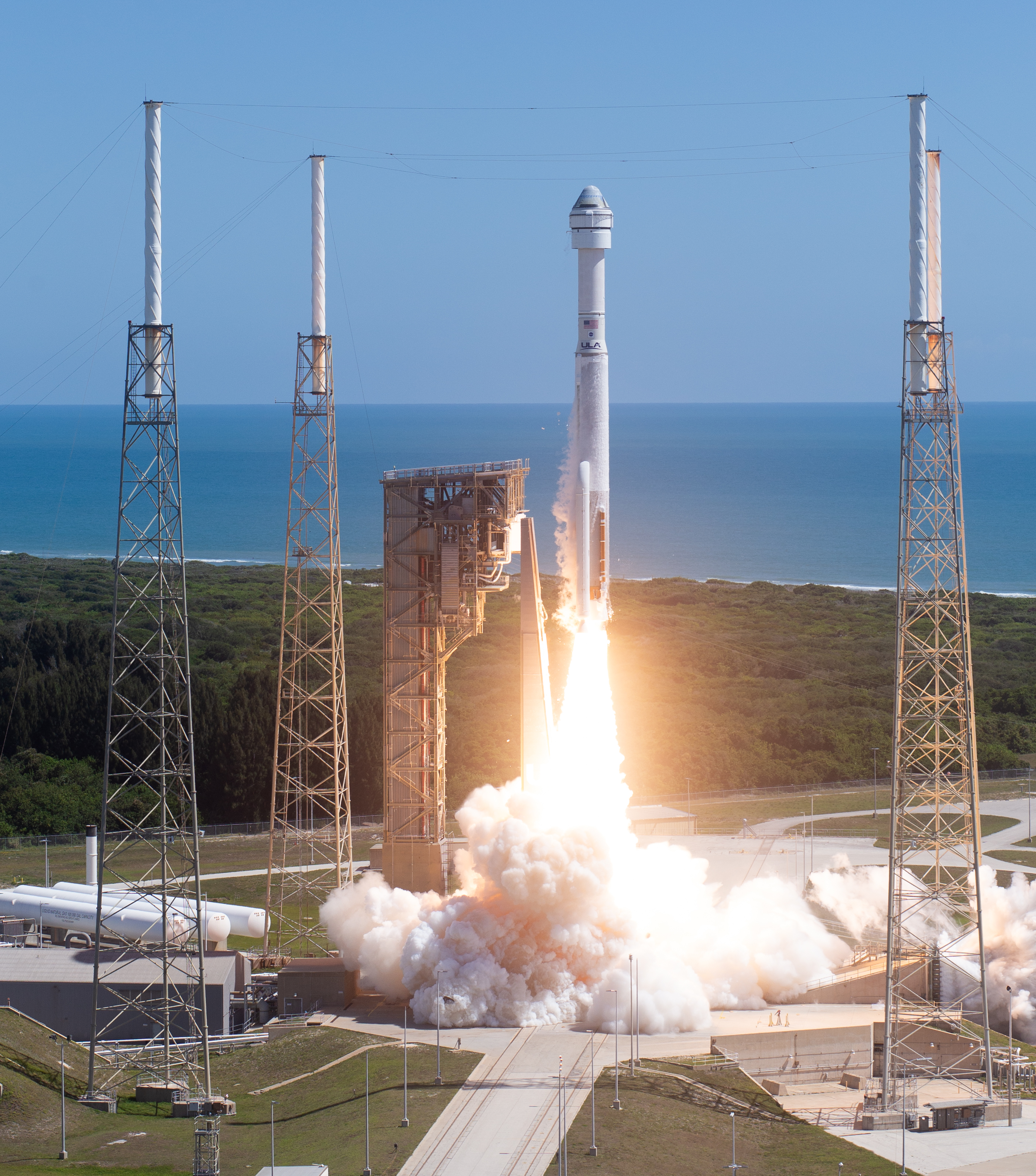
Boeing Starliner Calypso launches on the Crew Flight Test atop an Atlas V rocket.

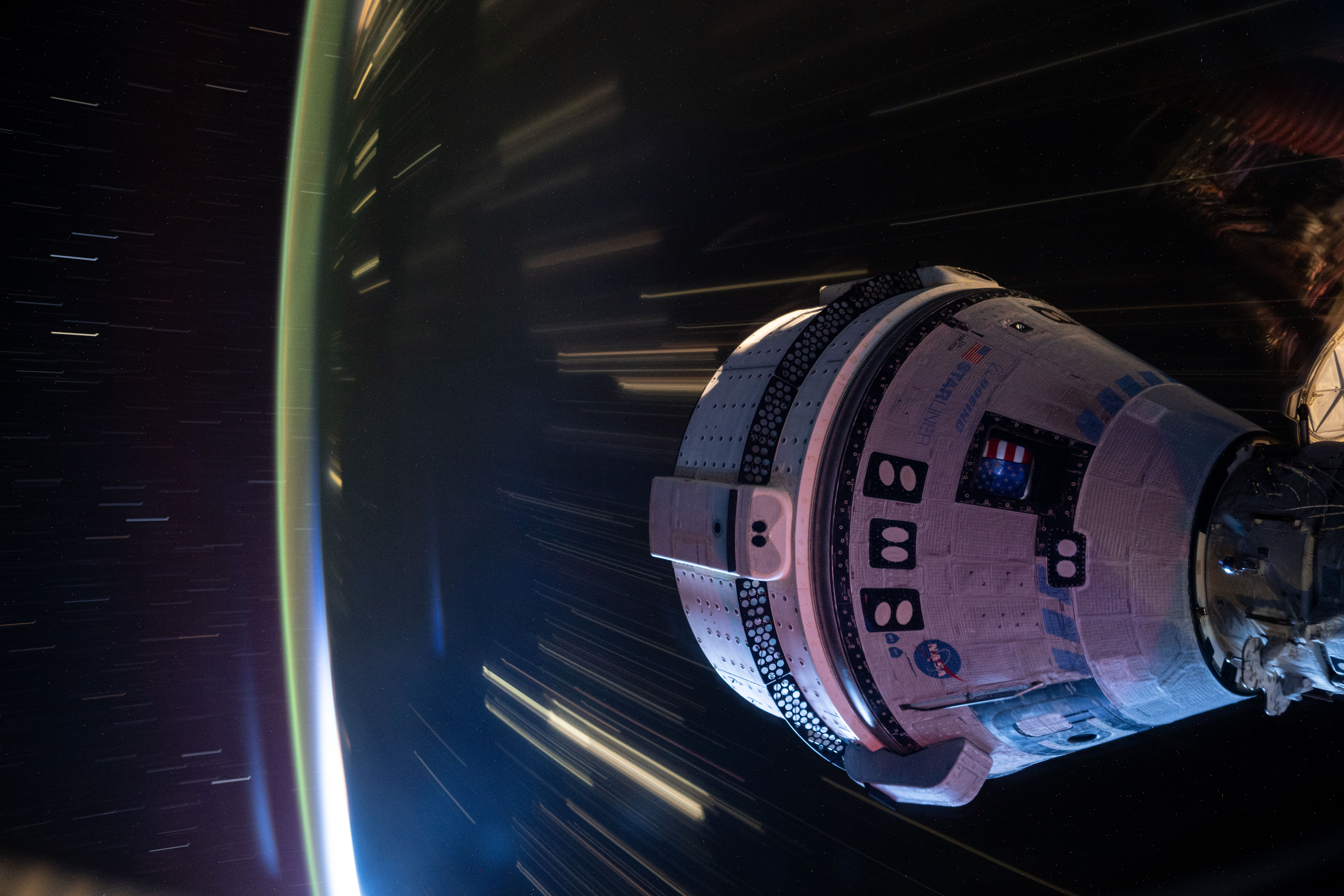
Boeing Starliner Calypso docked to the ISS during the Crew Flight Test

Starliner's crewed flight test was intended to be the capsule's final evaluation before entering regular NASA service. The mission plan called for launching two astronauts, commander Barry Wilmore and pilot Sunita Williams, to dock with the ISS for about a week and return to Earth roughly eight days later.

During approach to the ISS, five of spacecraft's eight aft-facing RCS thrusters failed. After the first two thrusters failed, Wilmore took manual control, noting the vehicle was less responsive than during a test the previous day. NASA waived standard flight rules to allow docking despite the degraded conditions. Eventually, four thrusters failed, resulting in a loss of full six degrees of freedom (6DOF) attitude control. The astronauts later described the situation as "very precarious."

With limited control over the capsule, abandoning the docking attempt was not safe, as the same thrusters were required to orient Starliner for its deorbit burn and reentry. NASA Mission Control, which Boeing contracted to operate the spacecraft, attempted a thruster reset. Wilmore stabilized the capsule and called down "Hands off," allowing Mission Control to override the flight software and reactivate the failed jets. Three thrusters were reenabled, but shortly after, a fifth thruster failed. A second reset restored all but one thruster, allowing Starliner to complete its planned autonomous docking.

A post-mission investigation report released in February 2026 found that the thruster failures were most likely caused by a combination of oxidizer heating and valve seal deformation. Elevated temperatures inside the doghouse containing the thrusters, generated by thruster firings, caused the nitrogen tetroxide oxidizer (NTO) to partially vaporize before reaching the combustion chamber, creating gas bubbles and reducing flow. At the same time, exposure to NTO, heat, and pressure caused the Teflon seals within the oxidizer valves to deform and expand, further restricting oxidizer flow to the engines. A subsequent ground investigation linked the thruster degradation specifically to the Teflon seals. While the on-orbit issues were replicated in tests at White Sands using hardware intended for future flights, they could not be reproduced on the in-flight Starliner.

During the mission, seven of the eight helium manifolds in the service module developed leaks. The investigation determined the most likely cause was incompatibility between the valve materials and NTO, combined with poorly fitting O-rings.

Despite NASA and Boeing's public reassurances, Wilmore and Williams later said that on June 6 when they docked they already privately doubted Starliner's ability to return them safely to Earth. Boeing, however, continued to express confidence in the capsule's design. NASA and Boeing continued to assess the situation, and by late August, NASA had concluded that the risks of returning with crew were too high. The spacecraft returned uncrewed and landed safely at White Sands Missile Range on 7 September at 04:01:35 UTC (6 September, 11:01:35 pm MDT, local time at the landing site), about six hours after it undocked from the ISS.

The mission, originally scheduled for 2017, had already been plagued by delays due to parachute system issues and wiring concerns. A launch attempt on May 6, 2024, was scrubbed due to an oxygen valve problem on the rocket. Subsequently, a helium leak in the service module further delayed the mission. Another attempt on June 1 was scrubbed due to a ground computer hardware fault. Starliner launched on June 5 at 14:52 UTC (10:52 am EDT).

During reentry, Starliner experienced a brief navigation glitch and the failure of a crew module orientation thruster, which were unrelated to the earlier RCS issues. The investigation determined that the orientation thruster likely failed due to corrosion caused by carbazic acid formed from residual propellant and carbon dioxide. The failure of this single thruster reduced the system to zero fault tolerance. The report noted that the crew module orientation system lacked the required two-fault tolerance for deorbit burns, a design limitation that had existed since early development but was not identified until the crewed flight test pre-launch.

NASA administrator Bill Nelson stated that Boeing CEO Kelly Ortberg committed to continuing the Starliner program despite the setbacks. Boeing, however, drew criticism after abruptly canceling its participation in a post-landing press conference and refusing to answer questions from journalists, opting to release only brief written statements.

An investigation report released in February 2026 retroactively classified the mission as a Type A mishap, NASA's most severe failure category, typically reserved for missions involving loss of vehicle or life. The report cited hardware failures, qualification deficiencies, leadership errors, and organizational shortcomings that created risks inconsistent with NASA's human spaceflight safety standards. Administrator Jared Isaacman said that while the spacecraft has design and engineering deficiencies requiring correction, he was most troubled by the failures in decision-making and leadership at both NASA and Boeing.

=== Starliner-1 (uncrewed) ===
Because NASA was unable to certify Starliner based on the crewed flight test, Boeing and NASA agreed that the next flight, Starliner-1, would not carry crew and that it would serve as a test flight for purposes of certification. On May 2, 2026, NASA confirmed that Starliner-1 will act as an ISS resupply mission. As of June 2026, teams continue to work through the technical problems, and NASA is considering appropriate launch opportunities for the Starliner-1 mission.

== Commercial use ==
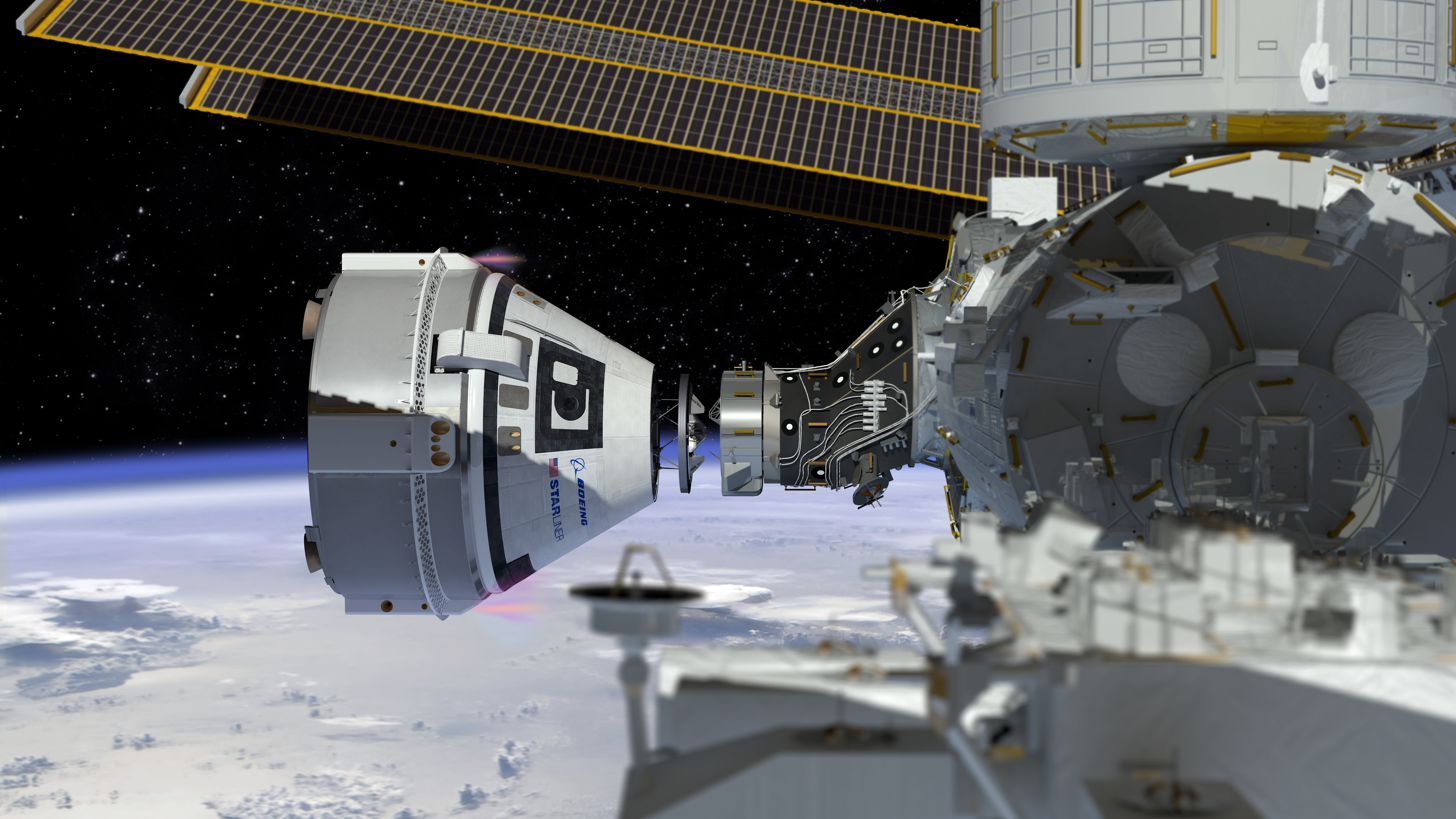
Artist's impression of a Boeing Starliner docking to the ISS

Under the CCP, Boeing owns and operates the Starliner capsules, allowing the company to offer non-CCP commercial flights if they do not interfere with NASA missions. While SpaceX has secured private commercial flights, Boeing has yet to do so.

The CCP agreement permits Boeing to sell seats for space tourists on ISS flights. While initially proposed, the extended length of typical ISS missions makes this unlikely.

In October 2021, Blue Origin, Boeing, and Sierra Nevada Corporation announced plans for a commercial space station called Orbital Reef. This "mixed-use business park" could be serviced by both Starliner and Sierra Nevada's Dream Chaser spacecraft.

== Launch vehicle ==
Starliner was designed to be compatible with multiple launch vehicles, including the Atlas V, Delta IV, Falcon 9, and Vulcan Centaur.

For the three completed test flights and up to six further missions, Starliner is expected to fly atop the Atlas V. However, United Launch Alliance, the operator of the Atlas V, ceased production of the rocket in 2024 after producing vehicles for all remaining contracted launches. The vehicles have been allocated to customers, including the six needed for the remaining Starliner flights.

The Starliner faces an uncertain future after that. Delta IV is retired and no more are available, the Falcon 9 is owned by crewed launch competitor SpaceX, and the Vulcan Centaur has not yet been human-rated, testing Boeing would have to pay for.

=== Configuration ===
For Starliner launches, ULA uses the Atlas N22 configuration. All other Atlas V launches use a payload fairing and the single-engine version of the Centaur upper stage. N22 is configured with no payload fairing, two solid rocket boosters (SRBs), and a Dual Engine Centaur second stage. Starliner is the only crewed payload for Atlas V.

While most Atlas V launches since 2021 have used the newer Northrop Grumman GEM63 SRBs, these boosters are not rated for human spaceflight. Therefore, crewed missions employ the older Aerojet Rocketdyne AJ-60A SRBs.

Although the Dual Engine Centaur had not been used since 2000 after the introduction of the more powerful Atlas V, it was brought back into service for Starliner missions. Two engines allow the rocket to fly a gentler and flatter trajectory to minimize the G-forces experienced by the astronauts and ensures the capsule can abort at any time, returning the crew to Earth in case of a problem.

== Launch profile ==
After passing through the stages of max q, SRB jettison, booster separation, Centaur ignition, nosecone and aeroskirt jettison, the Atlas V rocket releases the Starliner spacecraft at stage separation, nearly 15 minutes after lift-off on a 112 mi × 45 mi-high (181 km × 72 km) suborbital trajectory, just below the orbital velocity needed to enter a stable orbit around Earth. After separating from the Dual Engine Centaur, the Starliner's own thrusters, mounted on its service module, boost the spacecraft into orbit to continue its journey to the International Space Station.

The suborbital trajectory is unusual for a satellite launch, but it is similar to the technique used by the Space Shuttle and Space Launch System. It ensures that, if the spacecraft fails to make the orbital insertion burn, it will re-enter the atmosphere in a controlled way. The Starliner's orbit insertion burn begins about 31 minutes into the mission and lasts 45 seconds.

== List of spacecraft ==
As of January 2020, Boeing planned to have three Boeing Starliner capsules in service to fulfill the needs of the Commercial Crew Program with each capsule expected to be capable of being reused up to ten times with a six-month refurbishment time. On August 25, 2020, Boeing announced it would alternate between just two capsules for all planned Starliner missions instead of three.

S/N	Name	Type	Status	Flights	Flight time	Total flight time	Notes	Cat.
S1	None	Prototype	Retired	1	1m 19s (PAT)	1m 19s	Prototype used only for pad abort test.	
S2	TBA	Crew	Active	1	5d 23h 54m (OFT-2)	5d 23h 54m	Completed the OFT-2 flight.	
S3	Calypso	Crew	Active	2	2d 1h 22m (OFT); 93d 13h 9m (CFT)	95d 14h 31m	Named after Jacques Cousteau's ship RV Calypso. First Starliner to orbit during OFT, first to carry crew to space during CFT.	

== List of flights ==
List includes only completed or currently manifested missions. Dates are listed in UTC, and for future events, they are the earliest possible opportunities (also known as NET dates) and may change.

Mission and Patch	Capsule	Launch Vehicle	Launch date	Landing date	Remarks	Crew	Outcome
Pad Abort Test	S1	N/A	November 4, 2019		Simulating an escape from a failing rocket, Starliner's RS-88 engines lifted the capsule from a pad at White Sands. Only two of three parachutes opened, but was declared a success.	—N/a	Success
Orbital Flight Test	S3.1; Calypso	Atlas V N22	December 19, 2019	December 22, 2019	First uncrewed orbital flight test. Orbited but failed to rendezvous with ISS. Landed successfully.	—N/a	Partial failure
Orbital Flight Test 2	S2.1	Atlas V N22	May 19, 2022	May 25, 2022	Second uncrewed orbital flight test. Experienced OMAC and RCS thruster malfunctions, but successfully docked to ISS.	—N/a	Partial failure (Note: Retroactively classified in February 2026 as a partial failure.)
Crew Flight Test	S3.2; Calypso	Atlas V N22	June 5, 2024	September 7, 2024	Crewed flight test to ISS. Landed uncrewed due to malfunctioning RCS thrusters.	Barry Wilmore; Sunita Williams	Failure (Note: Retroactively classified in February 2026 as a Type A mishap, the most serious failure category, typically reserved for missions involving loss of vehicle or life.)
Starliner-1	S2.2	Atlas V N22	NET January 14, 2027	TBD	Uncrewed cargo flight to ISS.	—N/a	Planned
Starliner-2	TBD	Atlas V N22	2028	TBD	Crewed flight to ISS. Warren Hoburg was announced as commander, the other crew members have not been determined yet.	Warren Hoburg	Planned
Starliner-3	TBD	Atlas V N22	TBD	TBD		TBA	Planned
Starliner-4	TBD	Atlas V N22	TBD	TBD		TBA	Planned

In November 2025, NASA and Boeing modified the initial contract. The modified contract calls for three crewed flights after successful completion of the uncrewed Starliner-1 flight.

== Technology partners ==
- Aerojet Rocketdyne, reaction control system and retrorockets
- Airborne Systems, parachutes
- Bigelow Aerospace, elements of crew capsule
- Collins Aerospace, life support systems
- David Clark Company, spacesuits
- ILC Dover, airbags
- Samsung, mobile communications technology
- Spincraft, crew module pressure shell spin-form work

== See also ==
- List of crewed spacecraft
- Dream Chaser, a spaceplane under development
- Mengzhou, a human-rated spacecraft being developed in China
- Orel, a human-rated spacecraft being developed in Russia
