= Boeing Starliner Calypso =

Boeing Starliner spacecraft

Calypso
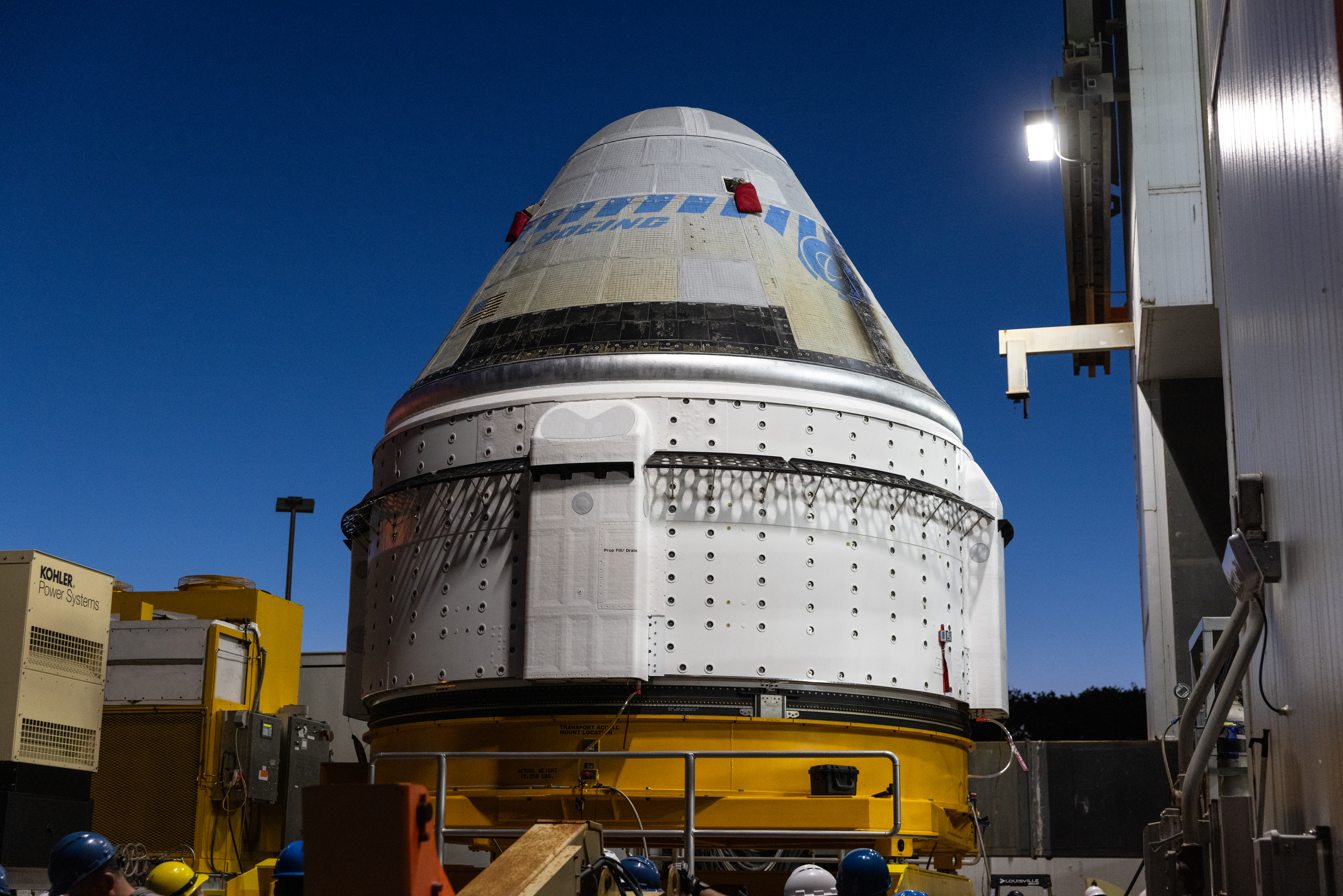
- Calypso at Cape Canaveral in April 2024.
- Type: Space capsule
- Class: Boeing Starliner
- Eponym: RV Calypso
- Serial no.: Spacecraft 3
- Owner: Boeing Defense, Space & Security
- Manufacturer: Boeing Defense, Space & Security

Specifications
- Dimensions: 5 m × 4.5 m (16 ft × 15 ft)
- Launch mass: 13,000 kg (29,000 lb)
- Power: Solar cells; 2.9 kW (3.9 hp)
- Rocket: Atlas V N22 (Note: N22 designates that the Atlas V has no payload fairing, two solid rocket boosters, and two Centaur second-stage engines.)

History
- Location: White Sands Missile Range
- First flight: 20–22 December 2019; Boeing Orbital Flight Test
- Last flight: 5 June 2024 – 7 September 2024; Boeing Crewed Flight Test
- Flights: 2
- Flight time: 95 days, 14 hours and 31 minutes

Boeing Starliners

Boeing Starliner Calypso (Spacecraft 3) is a space capsule manufactured by Boeing and used in NASA's Commercial Crew Program. On 20 December 2019, Calypso launched on the Boeing Orbital Flight Test mission, an uncrewed test flight of Starliner to the International Space Station. The spacecraft was scheduled to dock to the ISS and then return to Earth following a week in space, although due to several software issues the spacecraft was unable to rendezvous with the station and landed after two days in space, resulting in Boeing needing to schedule a second Orbital Flight Test. It flew with two astronauts for Starliner Crewed Flight Test on its second mission in June 2024, though the capsule returned to Earth uncrewed after a series of malfunctions during the mission caused NASA to deem a crewed return flight too risky, instead returning them on SpaceX Crew-9.

== History ==
In September 2014 Boeing was one of two companies selected by NASA to develop crewed spacecraft to ferry astronauts to the International Space Station, the other being SpaceX. Boeing planned to construct three Starliner spacecraft. The spacecraft's ability to be reused up to ten times with a six-month turnaround time between flights meant three spacecraft would be enough to satisfy the needs of the Commercial Crew Program.

Spacecraft 3 launched for the first time on Boe-OFT, the first orbital flight of Starliner, on 20 December 2019. The uncrewed spacecraft was scheduled to dock with the ISS the following day. However, due to software errors causing the spacecraft's Mission Elapsed Timer (MET) to be off by 11 hours, the spacecraft performed an "off-nominal orbital insertion burn" that prevented the spacecraft from being able to rendezvous and dock with the ISS during the flight. Instead, the spacecraft remained in orbit for two days, performing as many tests as possible without the ISS rendezvous, and landed at White Sands Missile Range, New Mexico on 22 December 2019.

Upon landing, it was announced that the spacecraft would be reflown on Starliner-1, the first operational flight of Starliner to the ISS. After the announcement, NASA astronaut Sunita Williams, commander of Starliner-1, named the spacecraft Calypso after Jacques-Yves Cousteau's oceanography vessel, RV Calypso. Calypso is the only Starliner spacecraft to be given an official name. Although Calypso was initially scheduled to return to space on Starliner-1, Boeing announced in March 2020 that they would refly the Orbital Flight Test as OFT-2, which rearranged the spacecraft assignments for subsequent missions. Calypso returned to space on Boe-CFT, the first crewed test flight of Starliner. Following the spacecraft's second flight it is unclear when Boeing or NASA will fly the spacecraft again. Boeing is contracted to fly five operational missions to the ISS under the Commercial Crew Program following Starliner-1, so Calypso will likely see space for a third time on a later crew rotation flight.

The launch window for the crewed test flight was scheduled to open on 7 May 2024. An overactive oxygen valve on the Centaur upper stage of the Atlas V rocket led to the launch being delayed by one day.

The flight was scheduled for liftoff at 2:34 UTC on 7 May 2024, but was scrubbed about two hours before liftoff due to an oxygen valve problem on the United Launch Alliance's (ULA) Atlas V. (Note: Boeing owns a 50% stake in ULA.) After the initial scrub, the launch was repeatedly delayed due to a helium leak in the Starliner service module.

The second launch attempt was on 1 June at 16:25 UTC, but was scrubbed 3 minutes, 50 seconds before liftoff when the ground launch sequencer computer registered a loss of redundancy due to a faulty power supply. The third launch attempt on 5 June at 14:52 UTC was successful.

== Flights ==
Calypso flew in space for the first time on the Boe-OFT mission on 20 December 2019. The spacecraft was subsequently reflown on the Boeing Crewed Flight Test in June 2024 after delays. It swapped places with Spacecraft 2 on the Starliner-1 mission.

Mission	Launch date (UTC)	Insignia	Crew	Remarks	Duration	Outcome
OFT-1	20 December 2019, 11:36:43		—N/a	First uncrewed orbital test flight of Starliner. The mission's main objective to rendezvous with the ISS was aborted due to a software error returning an incorrect mission time, which led to a late orbital insertion burn with excessive fuel expenditure. This, and other issues, led to the need for a second Orbital Flight Test.	2d, 1h, 22 m, 10s	Partial failure
Boeing CFT	5 June 2024, 14:52		(United States) Barry E. Wilmore (United States) Sunita Williams	First crewed flight test of Boeing Starliner, transporting two NASA astronauts to the ISS. Originally scheduled for 2021, repeated delays pushed back the launch date. Returned uncrewed due to thruster failures on ascent.	93 days, 13 hours, 9 minutes	Failure (Note: Retroactively classified in February 2026 as a Type A mishap, the most serious failure category, typically reserved for missions involving loss of vehicle or life.)
