= RS-88 =

US ethanol-oxygen rocket engine

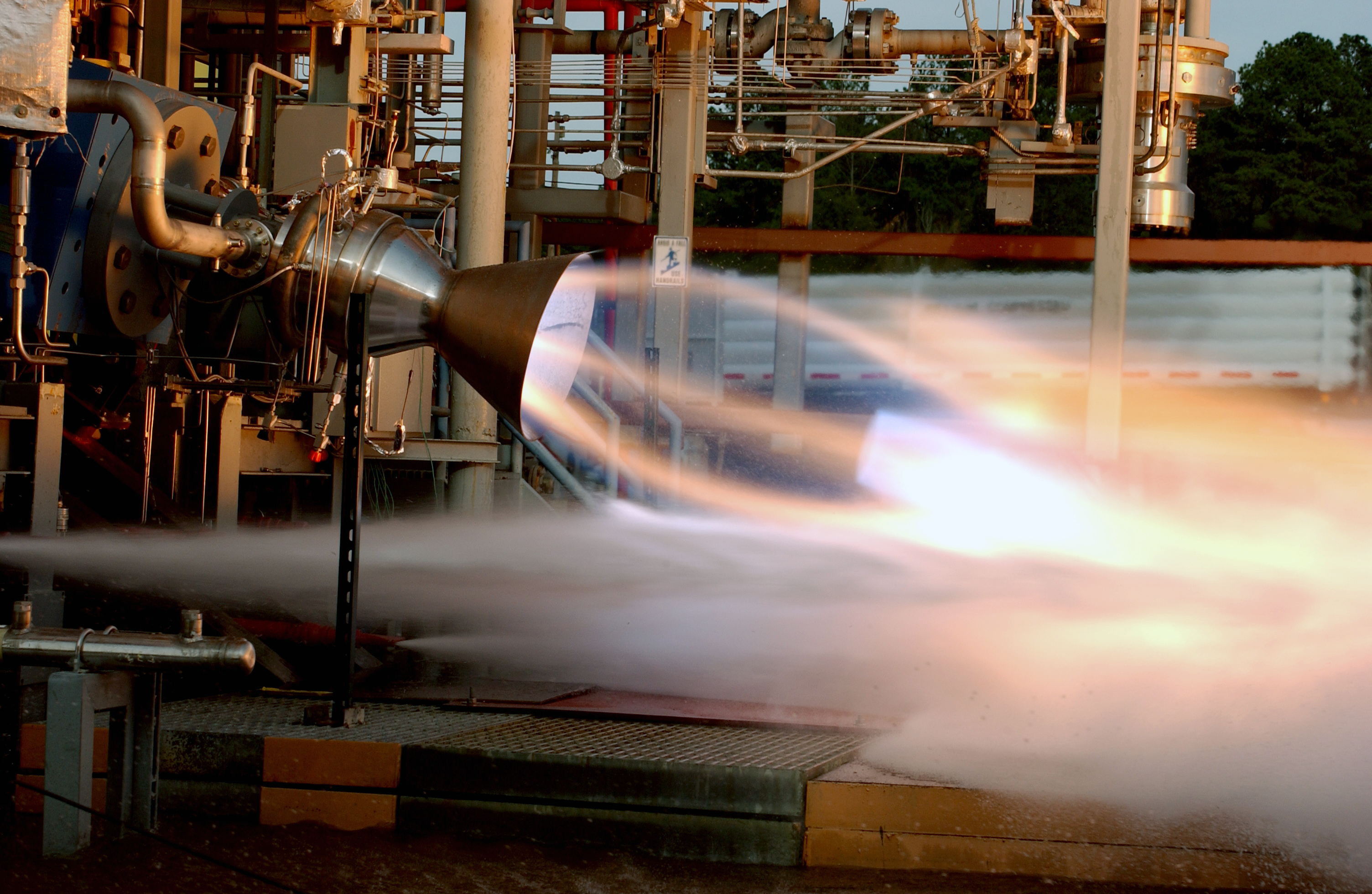
- An RS-88 is fired at Stennis Space Center
- Country of origin: United States
- Designer: Rocketdyne
- Manufacturer: Rocketdyne (1997–2005); Pratt & Whitney Rocketdyne (2005–2013); Aerojet Rocketdyne (2013–present)
- Status: Active

Liquid-fuel engine
- Propellant: LOX / Ethanol; MMH / NTO (LAE variant)
- Cycle: Gas-generator

Performance
- Thrust, sea-level: 220 kN (49,000 lb_{f}) (ethanol); 176.6 kN (39,700 lb_{f}) (hypergolic)

Used in
- CST-100 Starliner

The RS-88 (Rocket System-88) is a liquid-fueled rocket engine designed and built in the United States by Rocketdyne (later Pratt & Whitney Rocketdyne and then Aerojet Rocketdyne). Originally developed for NASA's Bantam System Technology program in 1997, the RS-88 burned ethanol fuel with liquid oxygen (LOX) as the oxidizer. It offered 220 kN (49,000 lb_{f}) of thrust at sea level.

A hypergolic derivative of the RS-88, fueled by monomethylhydrazine and nitrogen tetroxide, was chosen as the launch escape motor for the Boeing Starliner capsule.

== Origins and Testing ==
The RS-88 stemmed from NASA's Bantam System Technology Project, part of the Low-Cost Technologies effort of the larger Advanced Space Transportation Program. This project aimed to research and demonstrate technologies for a new, affordable launch system. While the program envisioned a technology demonstration flight in late 1999, it ultimately focused on engine development.

NASA tested the RS-88 in a series of 14 hot-fire tests, resulting in 55 seconds of successful engine operation in November and December 2003.

In 2003, Lockheed Martin selected the RS-88 for their pad abort demonstration vehicle. NASA successfully tested the engine in a series of hot-fire tests, demonstrating its reliability.

== Starliner Launch Escape System ==
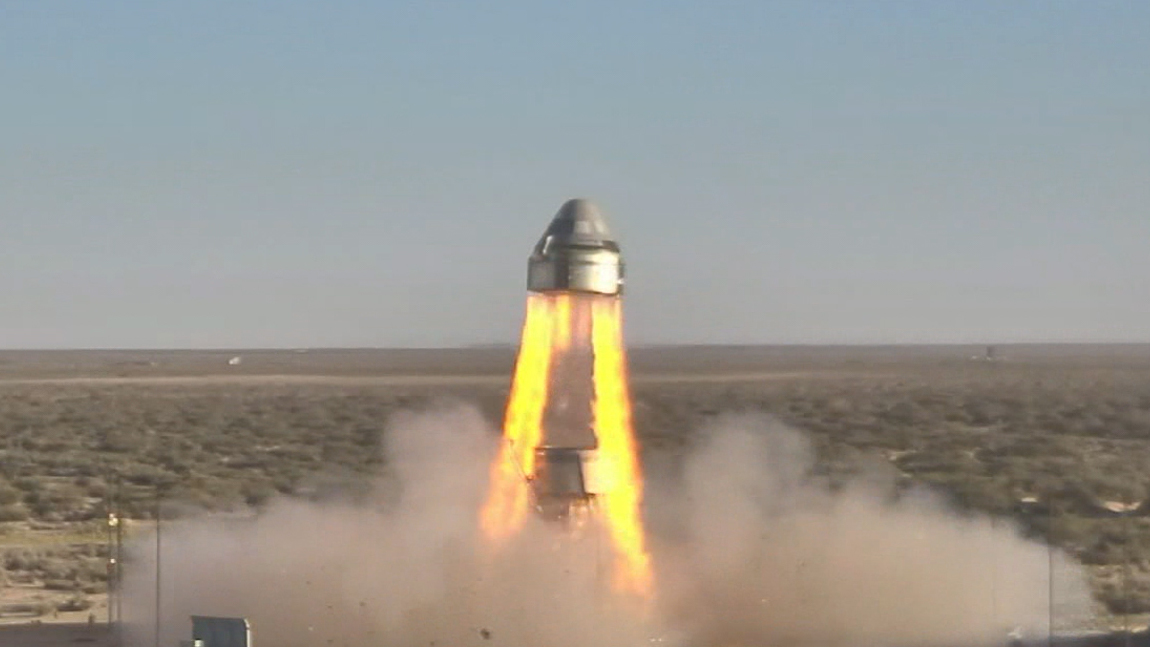
The Launch Abort Engine fires during a pad abort test of Starliner

A hypergolic derivative of the RS-88, fueled by monomethylhydrazine (MMH) and nitrogen tetroxide, was chosen as the launch escape motor for the Boeing Starliner capsule. This variant, called the Launch Abort Engine (LAE), provides 176.6 kN (39,700 lb_{f}) of thrust. Four LAE engines are used in Starliner's abort system to propel the capsule away from the launch vehicle in case of an emergency.

== See also ==
- NASA Advanced Space Transportation Program
- Merlin (rocket engine)
