= Boeing Starliner Spacecraft 2 =

Boeing Starliner spacecraft

Spacecraft 2
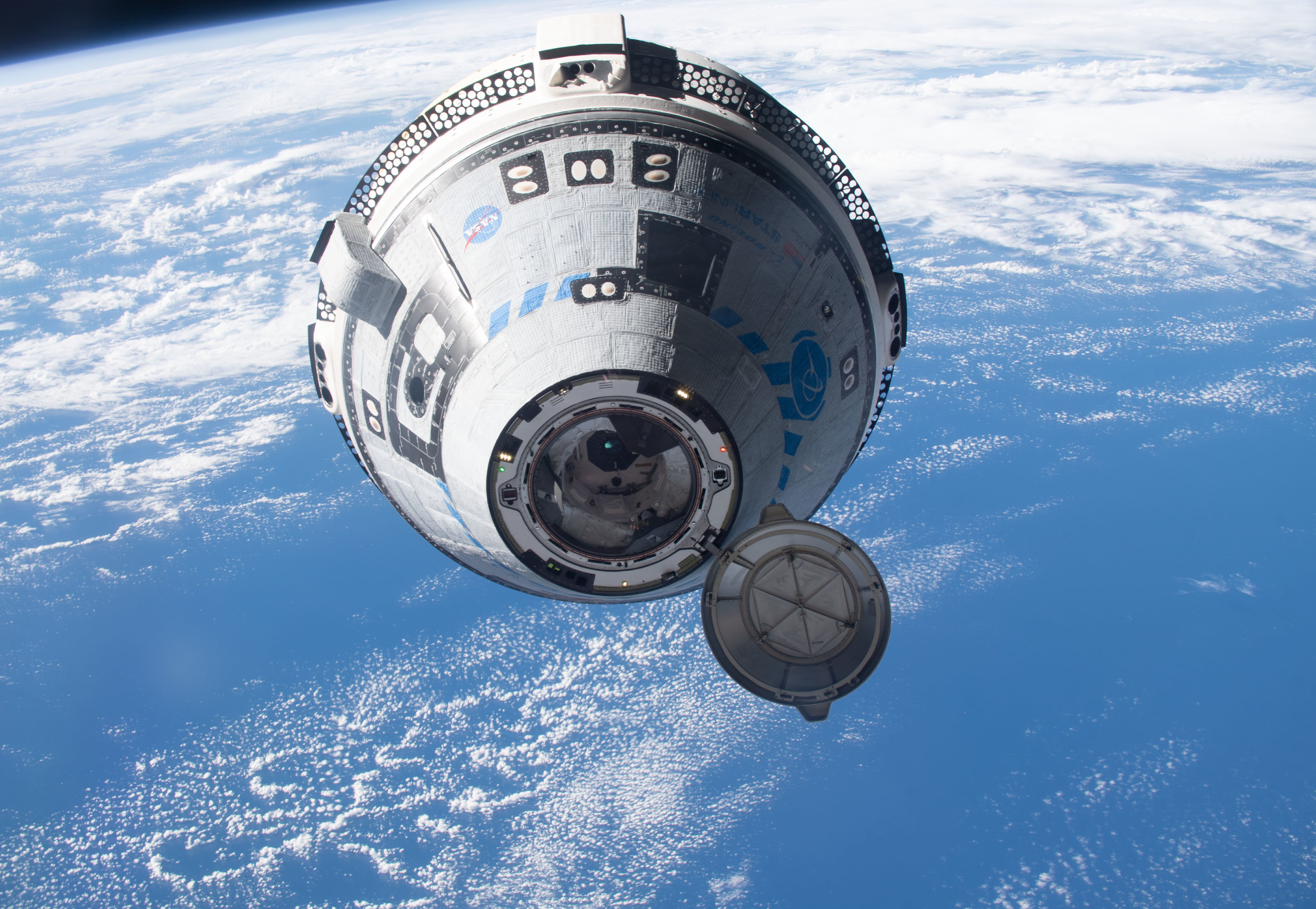
- Spacecraft 2 approaches ISS in May 2022
- Type: Space capsule
- Class: Boeing Starliner
- Owner: Boeing Defense, Space & Security
- Manufacturer: Boeing Defense, Space & Security

Specifications
- Dimensions: 5 m × 4.5 m (16 ft × 15 ft)
- Launch mass: 13,000 kilograms (29,000 lb)
- Power: Solar cells; 2.9 kW (3.9 hp)
- Rocket: Atlas V N22 (Note: N22 designates that the Atlas V has no payload fairing, two solid rocker boosters, and two Centaur second-stage engines.)

History
- Location: Cape Canaveral, Florida
- First flight: 19 May 2022 – 25 May 2022; Boeing Orbital Flight Test 2
- Flights: 1
- Flight time: 5 days, 23 hours, and 55 minutes

Boeing Starliners

Boeing Starliner Spacecraft 2 is the first of two active Boeing CST-100 Starliner spacecraft developed and built under NASA's Commercial Crew Program. The spacecraft was originally scheduled to make its maiden flight on Boe-CFT, the first crewed flight test of the Starliner spacecraft, although following the partial failure of the other CST-100 on Boe-OFT which required a repeat uncrewed test (Boe-OFT-2) of the spacecraft to be scheduled, Spacecraft 2 was reassigned to Boe-OFT-2 and also scheduled to fly Starliner-1 after being reassigned from CFT mission.

== History ==
In September 2014, Boeing was one of two companies selected by NASA to develop crewed spacecraft to ferry astronauts to the International Space Station, the other being SpaceX. Boeing planned to construct three Starliner spacecraft. The spacecraft's ability to be reused up to ten times with a six-month turnaround time between flights meant three spacecraft would be enough to satisfy the needs of the Commercial Crew Program.

The first Starliner flight test, Boe-OFT, was launched on 20 December 2019, carrying Starliner Calypso (Spacecraft 3) on what was expected to be a week-long uncrewed shakedown cruise to the International Space Station. The flight ended in partial failure, with Calypso being forced to return to Earth without arriving at the ISS due to an issue with the spacecraft's onboard Mission Elapsed Timer (MET) clock software. Prior to OFT, Spacecraft 2 was scheduled to fly on Boe-CFT, the first crewed Starliner flight test sometime in 2020, although the partial failure that occurred on Boe-OFT threw this into doubt. In July 2020, Boeing announced that following an investigation into the failure that occurred on Boe-OFT, they would schedule a second uncrewed flight test using the spacecraft and Atlas V N22 rocket originally manifested to be used on CFT, then scheduled for October 2020.

== 30 July 2021 launch attempt ==
After several schedule slips, Spacecraft 2 was scheduled to launch on 30 July 2021 from the Cape Canaveral Space Force Station on OFT-2, an approximately week-long test flight to the ISS. OFT-2 was in the late stages of preparation on 29 July 2021 and the Atlas V with the starliner stacked had just been rolled out to the pad. In an entirely separate mission, the Nauka module had docked at the space station earlier that morning, but its thrusters misfired, causing serious anomalies that would make the OFT-2 docking impossible until they were corrected. The Atlas V was immediately rolled back to the VIF, and the launch time was delayed to 3 August 2021 at 17:20:18 UTC. Atlas V was rolled out again 2 August 2021. The 3 August launch attempt was scrubbed due to technical problems with the propulsion system on Starliner causing another 24 hours recycle, with launch planned for 4 August 2021 at 16:57 UTC. Due to unexpected valve position indications in the Starliner propulsion system, the launch was further delayed to later in August while engineering teams investigated the problem. As a result, the Atlas V was rolled back to the VIF again for further testing.

== Analysis of inoperable valves ==
Starliner uses nitrogen tetroxide (NTO) as the oxidant in its propulsion system. There are 24 valves to control the NTO. During the pre-launch readiness check on the pad, sensors indicated that 13 of the NTO valves had failed to open on command. At the pad and later in the VIF, Boeing employees found that the sensors were correct and the valves had actually remained closed. The employees were able to get nine of them to function, but four remained inoperable. On 13 August 2021, Boeing decided to return the spacecraft to the Commercial Crew and Cargo Processing Facility in order to perform a deeper-level troubleshooting of the valves. Employees soon found that the valves had become corroded when moisture reacted with NTO, but it was not obvious how any moisture had entered the system. Boeing created an analysis team with members from Boeing, NASA, Aerojet Rocketdyne, and Marotta. Aerojet Rocketdyne provides the propulsion system. Marotta manufactures the valves. The team started by conducting an extensive system-level analysis to identify all possible entrypoints for the moisture intrusion, together with an analysis of the full history of Starliner 2 to determine the point in time when the intrusion might have occurred. For example, some of the valves had been installed and used in the pad abort test, and the OFT-1 flight, and during the Environmental Qualification Testing (EQT) round of tests.

After inspection it was found that the valves had been corroded by intrusion of moisture from the humid Florida air, which reacted with dinitrogen tetroxide, creating nitric acid, which then reacted with aluminum parts inside valves, creating corrosive products, mostly aluminum nitrate. These products then obstructed the valves' motions, causing the valves to get stuck.

== Modifications ==
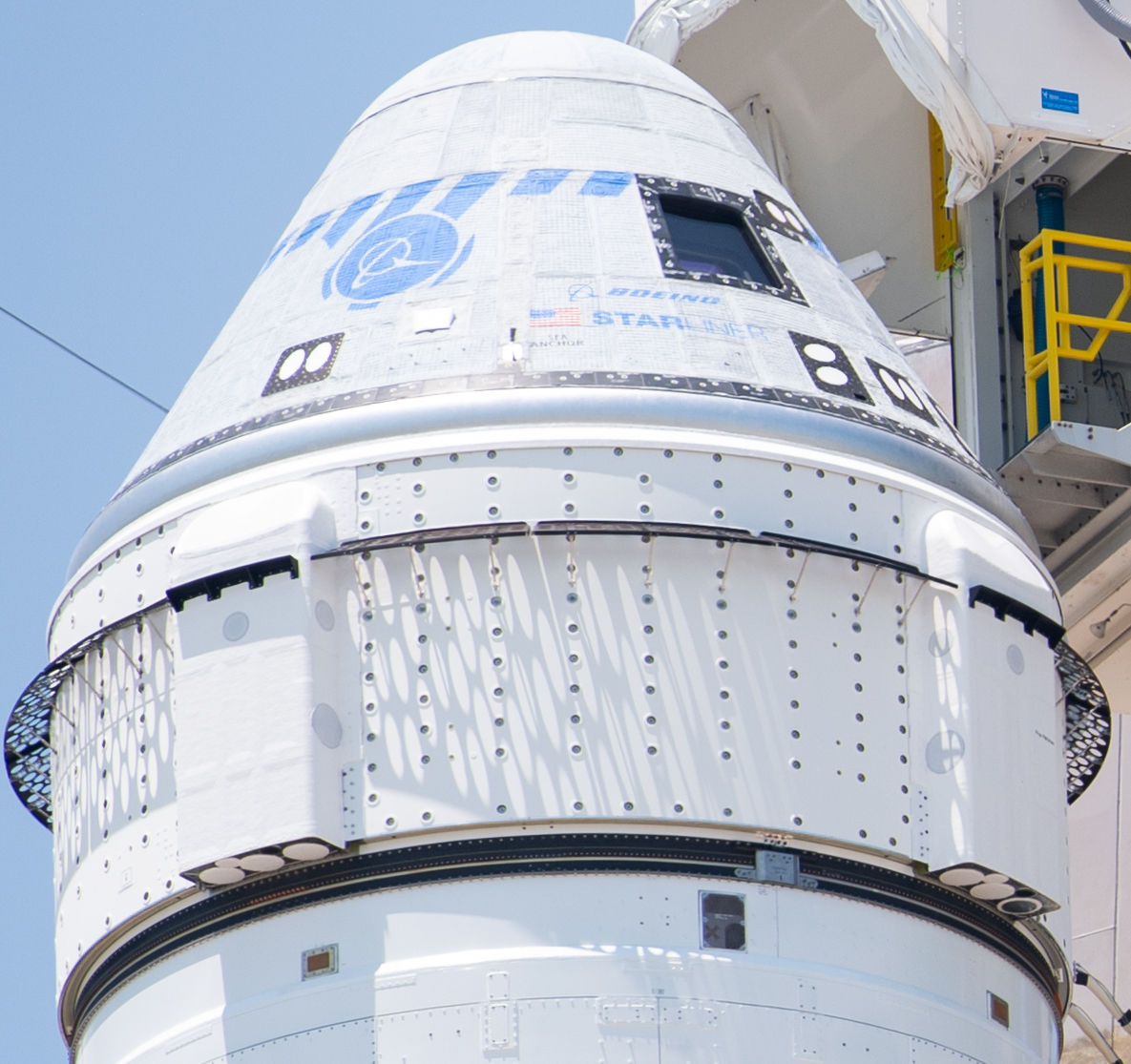
Spacecraft 2 at Cape Canaveral in May 2022

Boeing decided to replace the entire service module with the one intended for the CFT due to the valve issues, and sent the problematic service module to White Sands Test Facility in New Mexico for more valve tests. For the new Service module, Boeing has made no modifications to the valves themselves. Instead, Boeing created a cleaning system: nitrogen gas is used to remove all moisture from the valves. Boeing also sealed an opening in the electrical connectors to the valve, which Boeing thought might be allowing moisture into the valve. Moreover, Starliner will be fueled later, leaving less time for the fuel to interact with moisture. Finally, Boeing added a cycling system of the valves, to ensure the valves remain operational.

There was a commercial dispute between Boeing and Aerojet Rocketdyne over responsibility for fixing the problem. In the long run, Boeing is considering making changes to the valves including changing the aluminum housing for another material.

== Rescheduled mission ==
Spacecraft 2 launched on a rescheduled OFT-2 mission from the Cape Canaveral Space Force Station on an approximately week-long test flight to the ISS. The flight was the first to feature a cover over the NASA Docking System docking port. This was added to protect the docking system during the spacecraft's descent towards Earth at the end of its flight.

== Flights ==
Mission	Launch date (UTC)	Insignia	Crew	Remarks	Duration	Outcome
Boe-OFT-2	30 July 2021		—N/a	Repeat uncrewed orbital test flight of Starliner. Scrubbed due to valve failures.	5 days (planned)	Scrubbed
Boe-OFT-2	19 May 2022		—N/a	Repeat uncrewed orbital test flight of Starliner.	~6 days	Success
Starliner-1	NET December 2026		—N/a	Originally planned to be the first operational flight of Boeing Starliner, transporting NASA astronaut Scott D. Tingle, CSA astronaut Joshua Kutryk, and two other astronauts to the ISS. Originally scheduled to be the second Commercial Crew flight, delays have pushed the launch date back, and the mission was converted to an uncrewed cargo flight.	TBA	Planned
