= Nick Hague =

United States Space Force brigadier general and retired astronaut (born 1975)

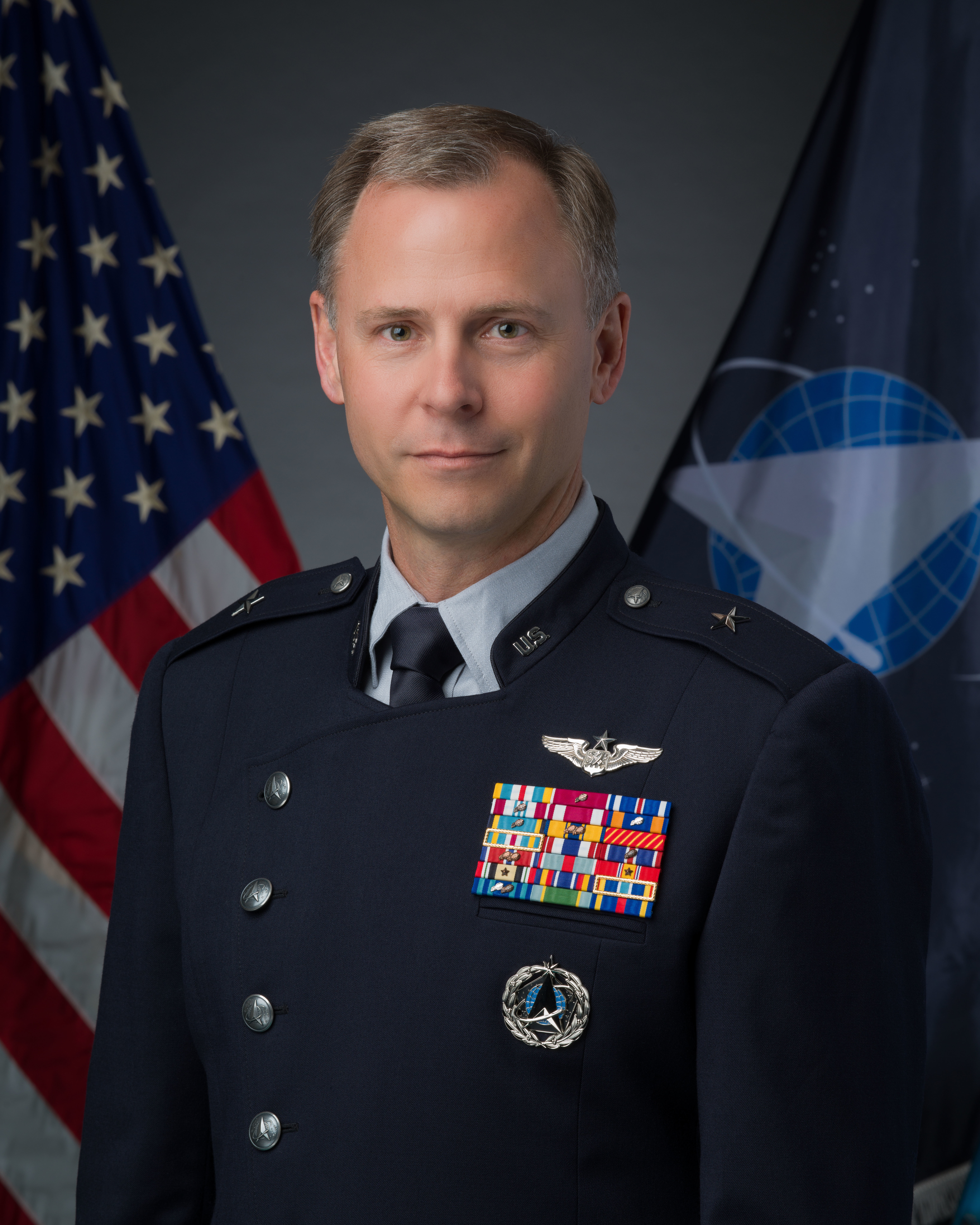
- Official portrait, 2024
- Born: Tyler Nicklaus Hague; 24 September 1975 (age 51); Belleville, Kansas, U.S.
- Education: United States Air Force Academy (BS); Massachusetts Institute of Technology (MS)
- Space career

NASA astronaut
- Rank: Brigadier General, US Space Force
- Time in space: 373 days, 20 hours, 25 minutes
- Selection: NASA Group 21 (2013)
- Total EVAs: 4
- Total EVA time: 25 hours, 56 minutes
- Missions: Soyuz MS-10 (aborted); Soyuz MS-12 (Expedition 59/60); SpaceX Crew-9 (Expedition 72)
- Mission insignia
- Retired: 23 December 2025

Tyler Nicklaus Hague (born 24 September 1975) is a United States Space Force brigadier general and retired NASA astronaut, selected as part of the 2013 astronaut class. Hague's first spaceflight was aboard Soyuz MS-10 on 11 October 2018, which was aborted shortly after launch. His second mission, Soyuz MS-12, successfully launched on 14 March 2019, where he joined Expedition 59/60 aboard the International Space Station (ISS) as a flight engineer. Hague later commanded SpaceX Crew-9, transporting the crew of Expedition 72 to the ISS. The mission returned astronauts Sunita Williams and Butch Wilmore, both of whom had previously participated in the Boeing Crew Flight Test, to Earth on 18 March 2025.

== Early life and education ==
Hague was born in Belleville, Kansas in 1975. He attended Peabody-Burns Elementary School, in Peabody, Kansas, while his father was the principal of Peabody-Burns High School from 1982 to 1989. In 1994, Nick graduated from Hoxie High School in Hoxie, Kansas, while his father was superintendent of the school district.

In 1998, he completed a BS in Aerospace Engineering from the United States Air Force Academy and continued to study and graduate with a MS in Aerospace Engineering from Massachusetts Institute of Technology in 2000.

== U.S. Air Force and Space Force career ==
Hague joined the U.S. Air Force and was commissioned as second lieutenant in May 1998. He was assigned to the Kirtland Air Force Base, Albuquerque, New Mexico in August 2000, working on advanced spacecraft technologies.

In 2003, Hague attended the United States Air Force Test Pilot School, in Edwards Air Force Base, California. Following graduation in 2004, he was assigned to the 416th Flight Test Squadron and tested the F-16, F-15 and T-38 aircraft.

Hague was deployed in Iraq for five months in 2004, supporting Operation Iraqi Freedom, and conducting experimental airborne reconnaissance.

In 2006, Hague started teaching courses in the Department of Astronautics faculty at the United States Air Force Academy, Colorado. He has taught courses in introductory astronautics, linear control system analysis and design.

In 2009, Hague received a fellowship for the Air Force Fellows program in Washington, D.C.

From 2012 until 2013 Hague worked in the Department of Defense as Deputy Chief of the Joint Improvised Explosive Device Defeat Organization.

Hague was promoted to colonel in 2016. His transfer to the U.S. Space Force was approved in December 2020. In 2019, Hague served as the Space Force's director of Test and Evaluation at the Pentagon.

Although Colonel Michael S. Hopkins became the first Space Force guardian in space when he transferred from the Air Force to the Space Force while onboard the International Space Station, Hague is the first guardian to launch into space.

He was nominated for promotion to the rank of Brigadier General on 13 June 2025, and this promotion was confirmed by the Senate on 29 June 2025. As of December 2025, he is responsible for the development and implementation of policy for all Space Force global operations, sustainment, training and readiness.

== NASA career ==
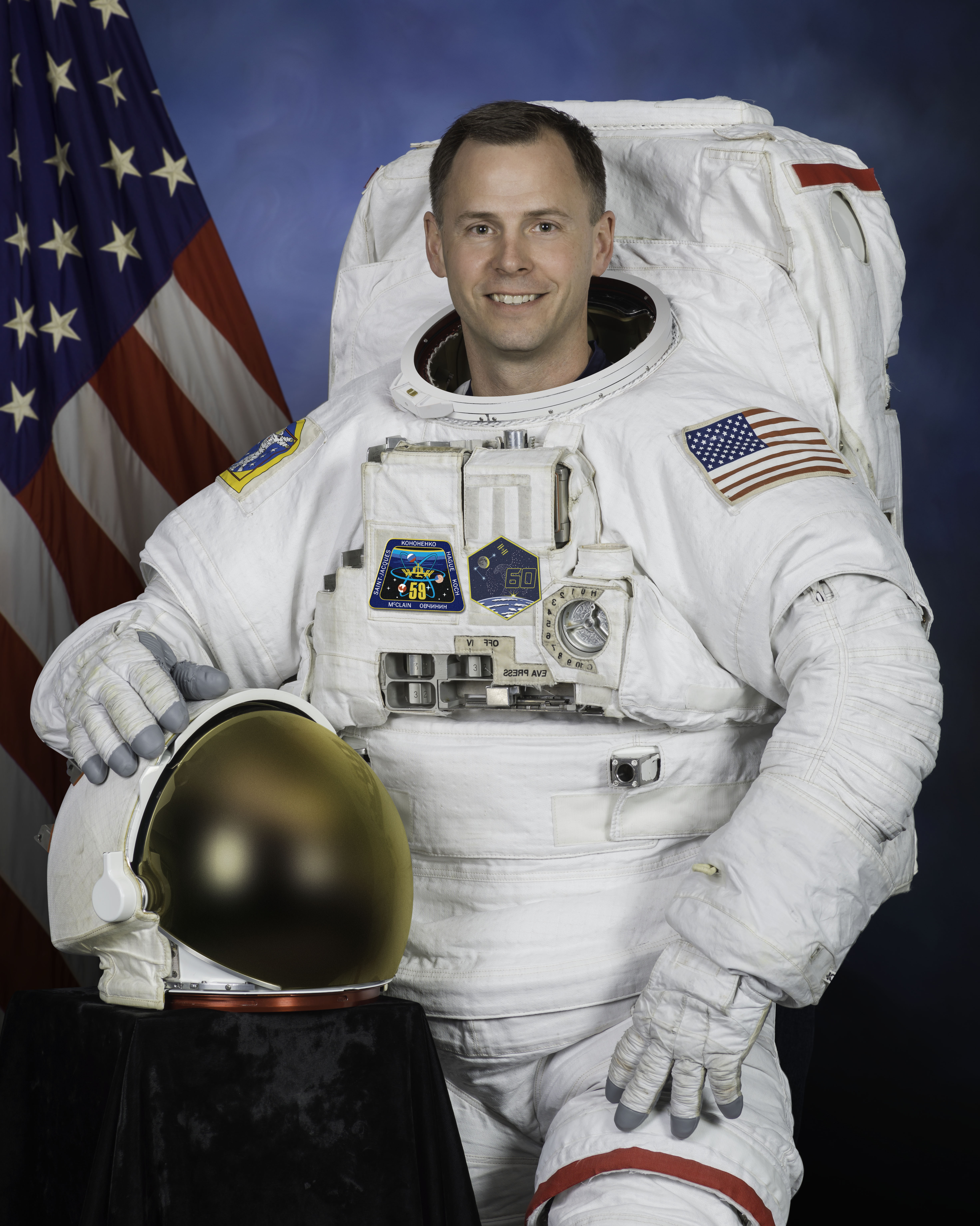
Official NASA portrait, 2018

Hague was selected by NASA as part of Astronaut Group 21 and completed training in July 2015. He retired from NASA on 23 December 2025 after completing two long-duration missions to the International Space Station.

=== Soyuz MS-10 (aborted) ===
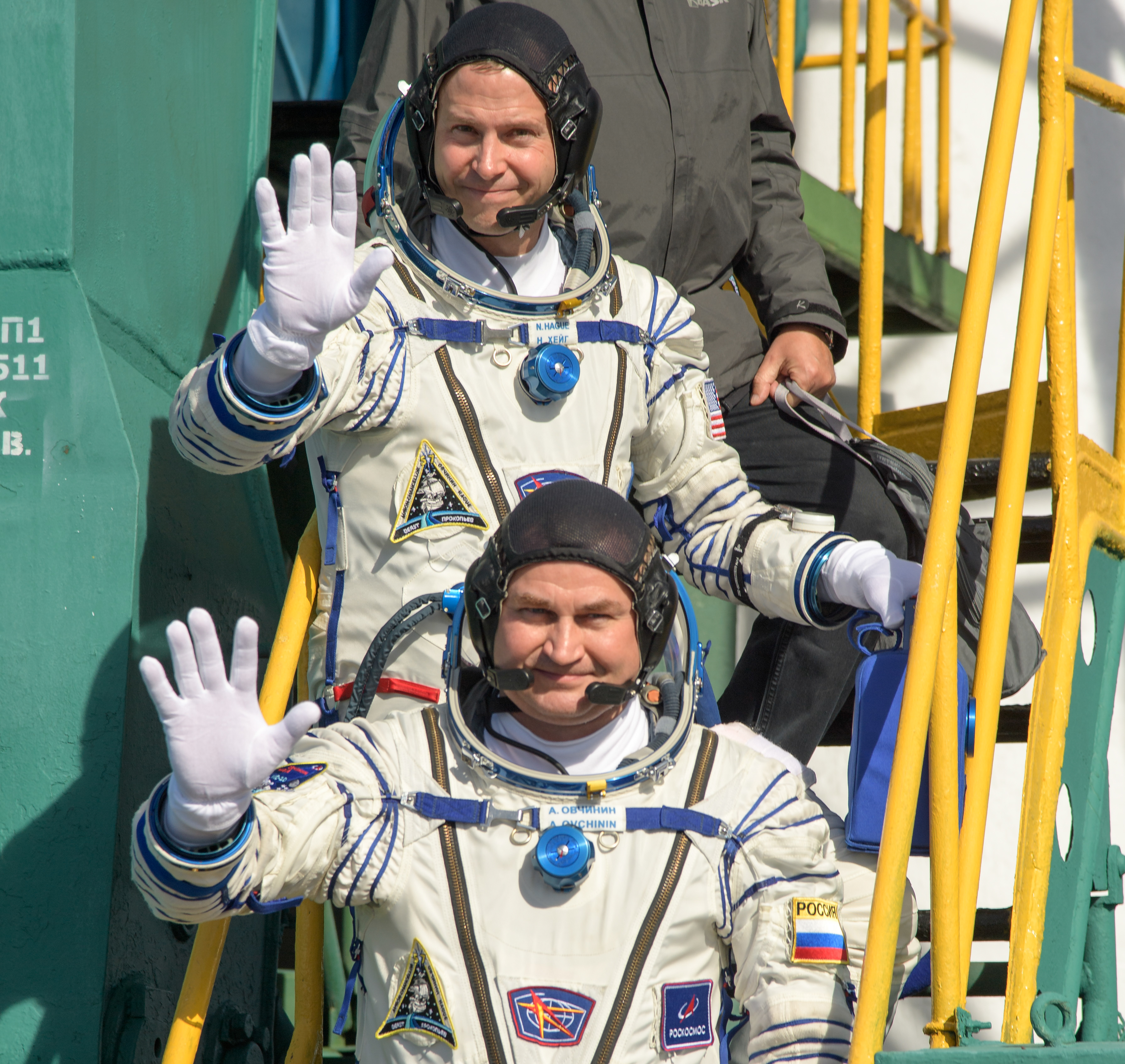
Hague (top) and Alexey Ovchinin (bottom) wave farewell prior to boarding the Soyuz MS-10 spacecraft on 11 October 2018

On 11 October 2018, Hague and Aleksey Ovchinin launched aboard the Soyuz MS-10 spacecraft, en route to the International Space Station. However, during the ascent, one of the rocket's side boosters collided with the core stage at an altitude of approximately 50 kilometers (31 miles), causing an explosion. In response, the spacecraft automatically activated its launch escape system, pulling the crew away from the failing rocket and reaching an apogee of 93 km (58 mi).

Although the crew was safe, the spacecraft was forced into a ballistic descent, during which they experienced forces of six to seven times Earth's gravity. Despite the intense descent, the crew landed safely 19 minutes and 41 seconds after liftoff, approximately 20 km (12 mi) east of Jezkazgan, Kazakhstan and about 402 km (250 mi) downrange from the launch site. A search and rescue team quickly confirmed that both astronauts were in good health.

The failed launch led to the temporary grounding of all crewed Soyuz missions. An investigation revealed that a manufacturing error in the rocket's side booster, specifically a damaged joint, prevented proper separation during flight.

Though the spacecraft did not cross the Kármán line at 100 km (62 mi), the USAF defines the boundary of space at 80 km (50 mi), technically qualifying Hague for the United States Astronaut Badge. Instead, Hague was awarded a custom NASA Astronaut Pin made of tin, as opposed to the gold pin typically given to astronauts who have flown in space.

=== Expedition 59/60 ===
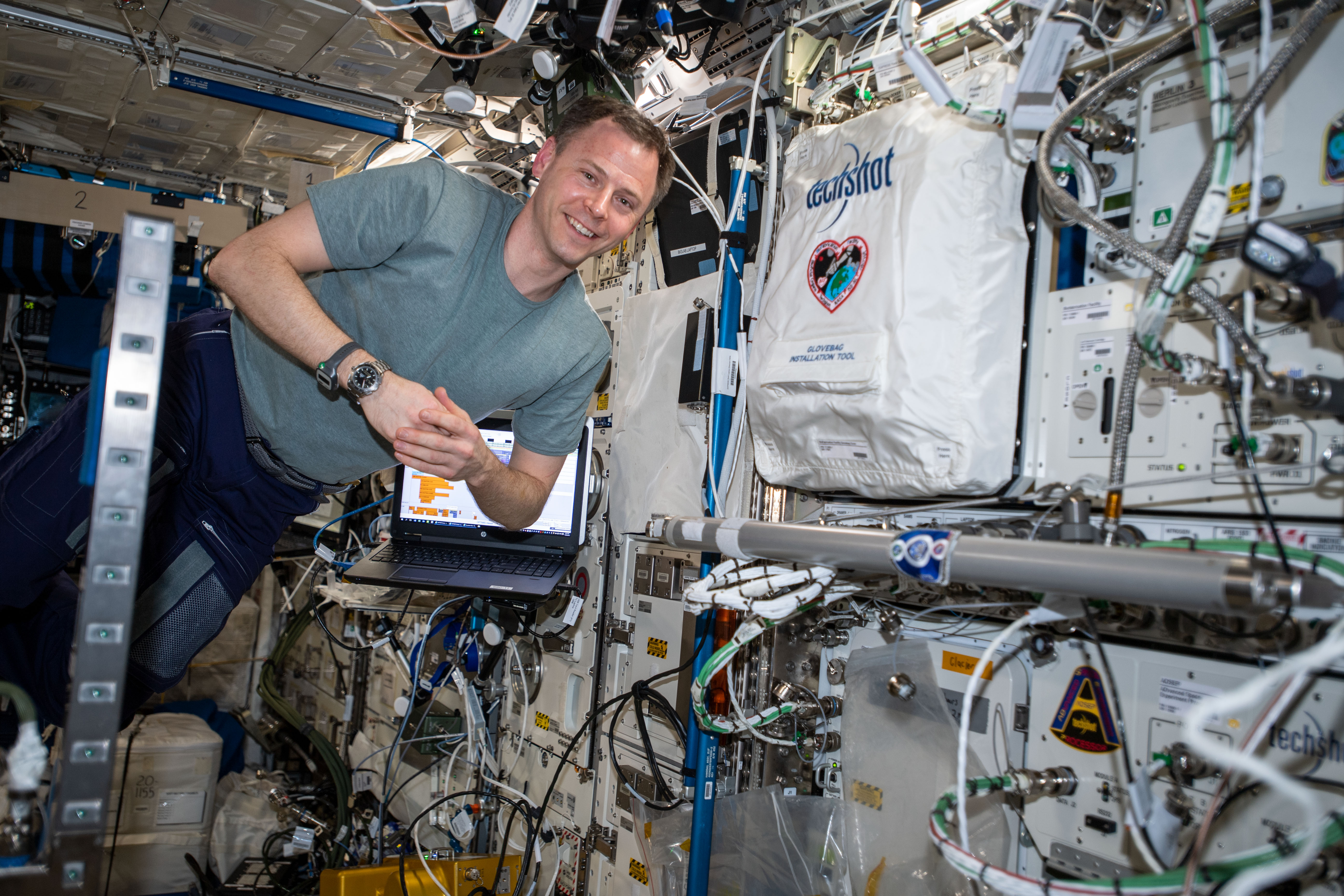
Hague working in the Columbus module during Expedition 60

Hague launched successfully to the International Space Station (ISS) on 14 March 2019, aboard Soyuz MS-12, alongside Ovchinin and fellow NASA astronaut Christina Koch. The trio joined Commander Oleg Kononenko and Flight Engineers David Saint-Jacques and Anne McClain on Expedition 59. After the departure of Kononenko, Saint-Jacques, and McClain in July 2019, Ovchinin, Hague, and Koch transitioned to Expedition 60, with Ovchinin taking command of the station. The crew would return to Earth in early October 2019.

It was under consideration for Hague to stay on the ISS after the landing of Soyuz MS-12, transferring to Soyuz MS-15 in order to return with a cosmonaut from the Mohammed bin Rashid Space Centre of the United Arab Emirates. If this plan had proceeded, Hague would have spent over 14 months aboard the ISS, a mission comparable in length to Valeri Polyakov's Soyuz TM-18/Soyuz TM-20 mission to the Mir space station, which lasted 437 days, 17 hours, and 58 minutes— the longest single spaceflight in history. However, in a February 2019 interview, Hague confirmed that his mission would last 204 days, and the extended stay was no longer an option.

On 22 March 2019, Hague and fellow NASA astronaut Anne McClain conducted their first spacewalk, lasting 6 hours and 39 minutes. During the EVA, they installed adapter plates while Dextre swapped the ISS batteries. They also removed debris from the Unity module in preparation for the arrival of Cygnus NG-11 in April, stowed tools for the repair of the flex hose rotary coupler, and secured tiebacks on the solar array blanket boxes.

On 29 March 2019, Hague performed his second EVA with Koch. The spacewalk was originally intended to be the first all-female EVA, however, space suit issues led to Hague being assigned. The EVA lasted 6 hours and 45 minutes.

On 21 August 2019, Hague performed his third EVA alongside NASA astronaut Andrew R. Morgan. The EVA, which lasted 6 hours and 32 minutes, involved installing a new International Docking Adapter on the Harmony module. During this EVA, Hague wore the Artemis program logo on his suit.

=== Expedition 72 ===
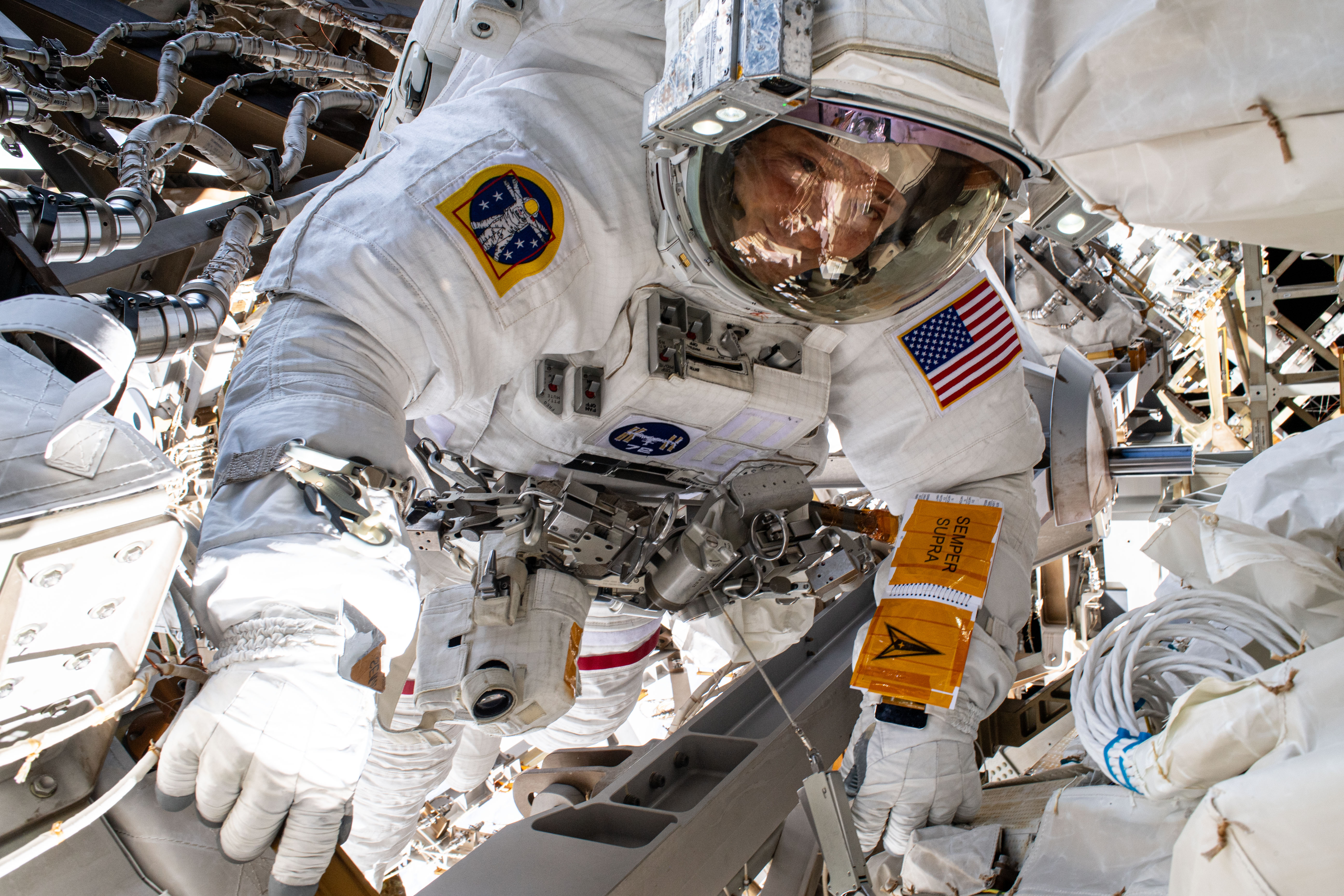
Hague during a spacewalk wearing the Space Force Delta on his arm along with the motto

Hague served as the commander of SpaceX Crew-9 flight to the International Space Station, transporting the crew of Expedition 72.

Initially, Hague was slated to be the pilot of Crew-9. However, following changes in mission plans, he was appointed commander. The mission was originally planned to launch four crew members: NASA astronaut Zena Cardman as commander, Hague as pilot, Stephanie Wilson as mission specialist, and Roscosmos cosmonaut Aleksandr Gorbunov as mission specialist. However, due to technical issues with the Boeing Starliner, which returned to Earth uncrewed, Crew-9 was adjusted to accommodate two open seats for returning Boeing Crew Flight Test astronauts Barry E. Wilmore and Sunita Williams.

Following the change, NASA appointed Hague as the commander of Crew-9 due to his prior spaceflight experience. To accommodate these changes, Hague and Gorbunov (who would now occupy the pilot's seat) worked with NASA, SpaceX, Cardman, and Wilson to modify the mission's tasks to identify how Hague could assume many of the tasks typically divided between the commander and pilot, and determine which tasks could be assigned to Gorbunov.

Hague performed his fourth EVA on 16 January 2025, alongside Expedition 72 commander Sunita Williams. During the six-hour spacewalk, the pair replaced a rate gyro assembly, installed patches on the Neutron Star Interior Composition Explorer (NICER) X-ray telescope, replaced a reflector on the International Docking Adapter on Harmony's zenith side, and conducted checks for future maintenance work on the Alpha Magnetic Spectrometer. During this EVA, Hague wore the Space Force Delta on his arm, along with the Space Force motto "Semper Supra" (Latin for 'always above').

The crew returned to Earth on 18 March 2025.

== Honors and awards ==
During his service in the Air Force and Space Force, Hague has received the following awards:

=== Badges ===
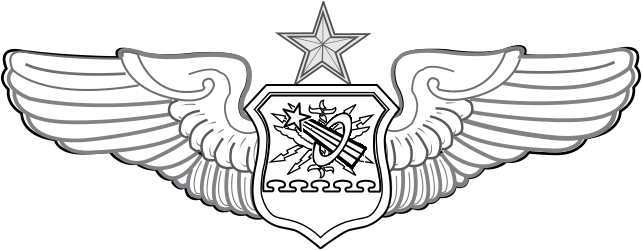
Senior Astronaut Observer Badge
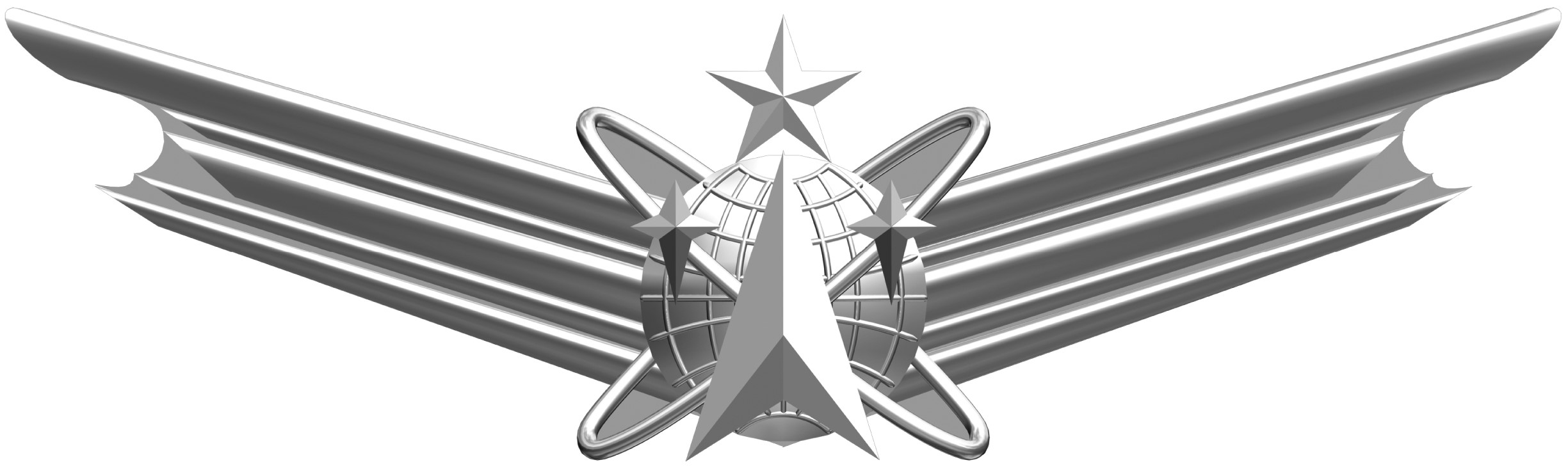
Senior Space Operations Badge

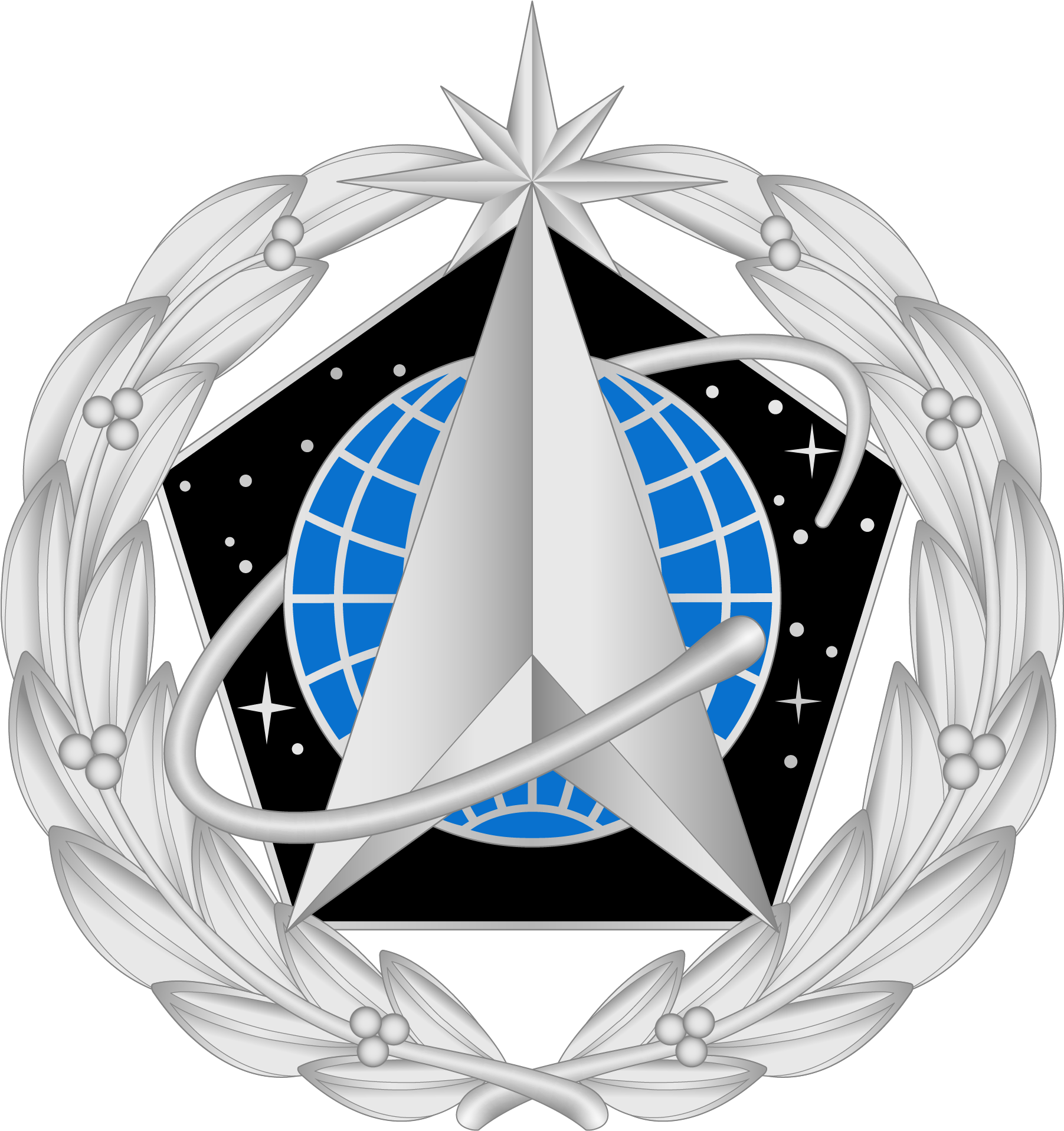

Space Staff Badge

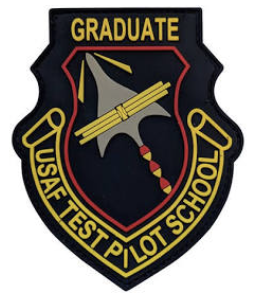

USAF Test Pilot School Graduate Patch

=== Ribbons ===
Defense Superior Service Medal
Legion of Merit with one bronze oak leaf cluster
Distinguished Flying Cross
Defense Meritorious Service Medal with one bronze oak leaf cluster
Meritorious Service Medal
Air Medal with one silver oak leaf cluster
Aerial Achievement Medal with one bronze oak leaf cluster
Air and Space Commendation Medal with two bronze oak leaf clusters
Combat Action Medal
Joint Meritorious Unit Award
Meritorious Unit Award
Air and Space Outstanding Unit Award with one bronze oak leaf cluster
Air and Space Organizational Excellence Award with two bronze oak leaf clusters
Air and Space Recognition Ribbon
National Defense Service Medal with one bronze service star
Iraq Campaign Medal with one bronze service star
Global War on Terrorism Service Medal
Air and Space Expeditionary Service Ribbon with gold frame
Air and Space Longevity Service Award with one silver and one bronze oak leaf cluster
Small Arms Expert Marksmanship Ribbon
Air and Space Training Ribbon

=== Awards ===
- Distinguished Graduate, United States Air Force Academy
- Distinguished Graduate and top flight test engineer, United States Air Force Test Pilot School Class 03A
- Order of Courage, Russian Federation

== Dates of promotion ==
Rank	Branch	Date
Second Lieutenant	Air Force	27 May 1998
First Lieutenant	Air Force	27 May 2000
Captain	Air Force	27 May 2002
Major	Air Force	1 September 2007
Lieutenant Colonel	Air Force	1 December 2011
Colonel	Air Force	1 June 2016
Colonel	Space Force	December 2020
Brigadier General	Space Force	27 June 2025

== Personal life ==
Hague met his wife, Col. Catie Hague, in 1996 at the Air Force Academy. They have two sons. Hague is a Doctor Who fan.
