= Soyuz MS-12 =

2019 Russian crewed spaceflight to the ISS

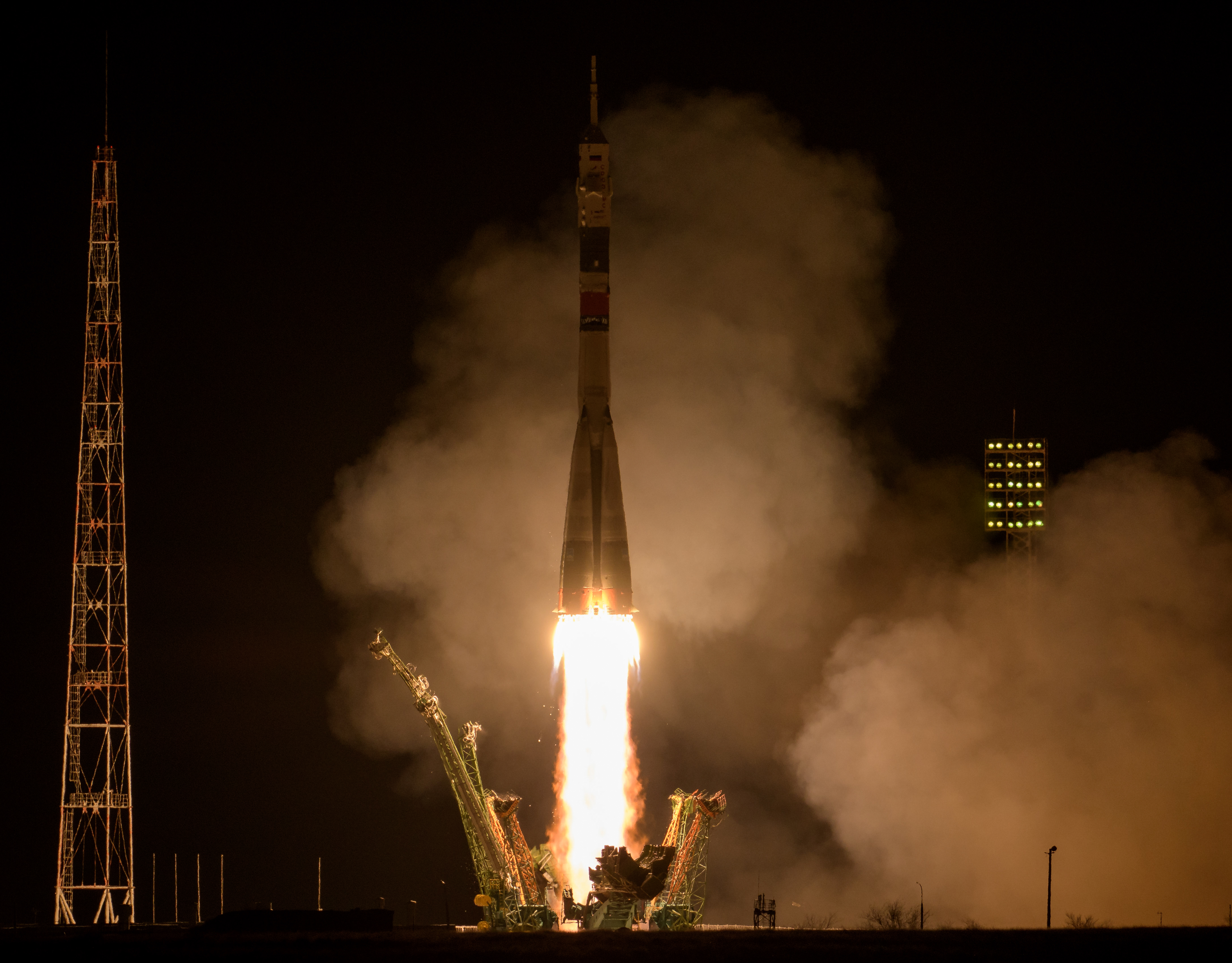
- The launch of Soyuz MS-12
- Operator: Roscosmos
- COSPAR ID: 2019-013A
- SATCAT no.: 44069
- Mission duration: 202d 15h 46m
- Distance travelled: 86.1 million miles.
- Orbits completed: 3,248

Spacecraft properties
- Spacecraft: Soyuz Spacecraft
- Spacecraft type: Soyuz-MS 11F747
- Manufacturer: Energia

Crew
- Crew size: 3
- Members: Aleksey Ovchinin; Nick Hague
- Launching: Christina Koch
- Landing: Hazza Al Mansouri
- Callsign: Burlak

Start of mission
- Launch date: 14 March 2019, 19:14:08 UTC
- Rocket: Soyuz-FG
- Launch site: Baikonur, Pad 1/5
- Contractor: RKTs Progress

End of mission
- Landing date: 3 October 2019, 10:59 UTC
- Landing site: 47°24'04.44"N, 69°34'14.1"E

Orbital parameters
- Reference system: Geocentric
- Regime: Low Earth
- Inclination: 51.6°

Docking with ISS
- Docking port: Rassvet nadir
- Docking date: 15 March 2019, 01:01 UTC
- Undocking date: 3 October 2019, 07:37 UTC
- Time docked: 202d 6h 36m
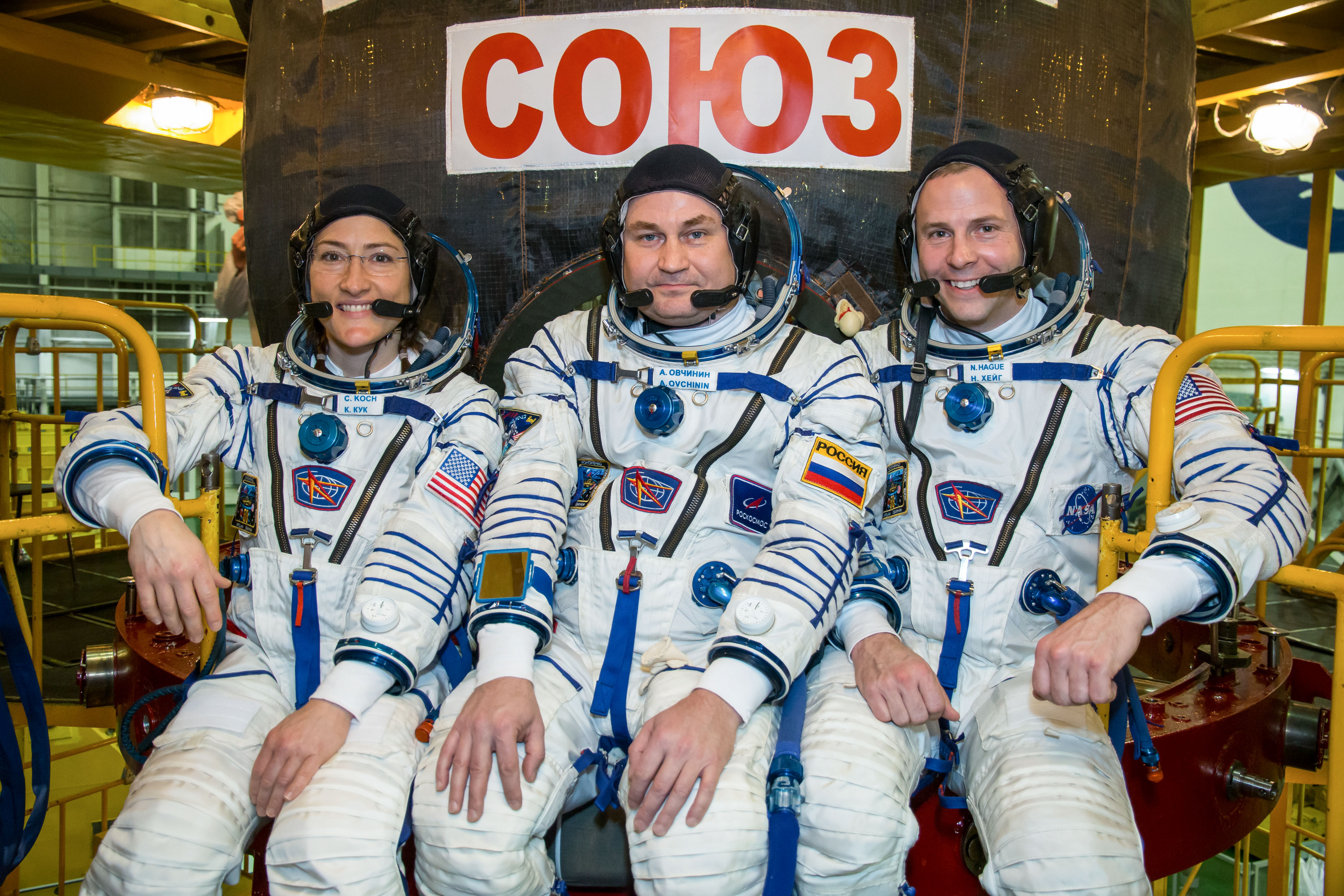
- Mission insignia, which incorporated elements from the MS-10 mission insignia (l-r) Koch, Ovchinin and Hague Soyuz programme (crewed)

Soyuz MS-12 was a Soyuz spaceflight that launched on 14 March 2019, carrying three members of the Expedition 59 crew to the International Space Station. The mission ended on 3 October 2019 when Soyuz-MS-12 successfully landed.

== Crew ==
Prime crew
Position	Launching crew	Landing crew
Commander	(Russia) Aleksey Ovchinin, Roscosmos; Expedition 59/60; Second (Note: Not counting the aborted flight of Soyuz MS-10.) spaceflight	
Flight engineer	(United States) Nick Hague, NASA; Expedition 59/60; First spaceflight	
Flight engineer/Spaceflight participant	(United States) Christina Koch, NASA; Expedition 59/60/61; First spaceflight	(United Arab Emirates) Hazza Al Mansouri, MBRSC; First spaceflight

Backup crew
Position	Crew
Commander	(Russia) Aleksandr Skvortsov, Roscosmos
Flight engineer	(Italy) Luca Parmitano, ESA
Flight engineer	(United States) Andrew R. Morgan, NASA

== Original crew ==
Soyuz MS-12 was scheduled to be the debut flight for Hazza Al Mansouri or Sultan Al Neyadi, the first two astronauts from the United Arab Emirates, but this was delayed to flight Soyuz MS-15 following the Soyuz MS-10 mission failure.

Prime crew
Position	Launching crew	Landing crew
Commander	(Russia) Oleg Skripochka, Roscosmos; Expedition 59; Third spaceflight	
Flight engineer	(United States) Christina Koch, NASA; Expedition 59; First spaceflight	
Spaceflight participant	(United Arab Emirates) Hazza Al Mansouri, MBRSC; First spaceflight	None

Backup crew
Position	Crew
Commander	(Russia) Andrei Borisenko, Roscosmos
Flight engineer	(United States) Jessica Meir, NASA
Flight engineer	(United Arab Emirates) Sultan Al Neyadi, MBRSC
