= Barry Wilmore =

American astronaut (born 1962)

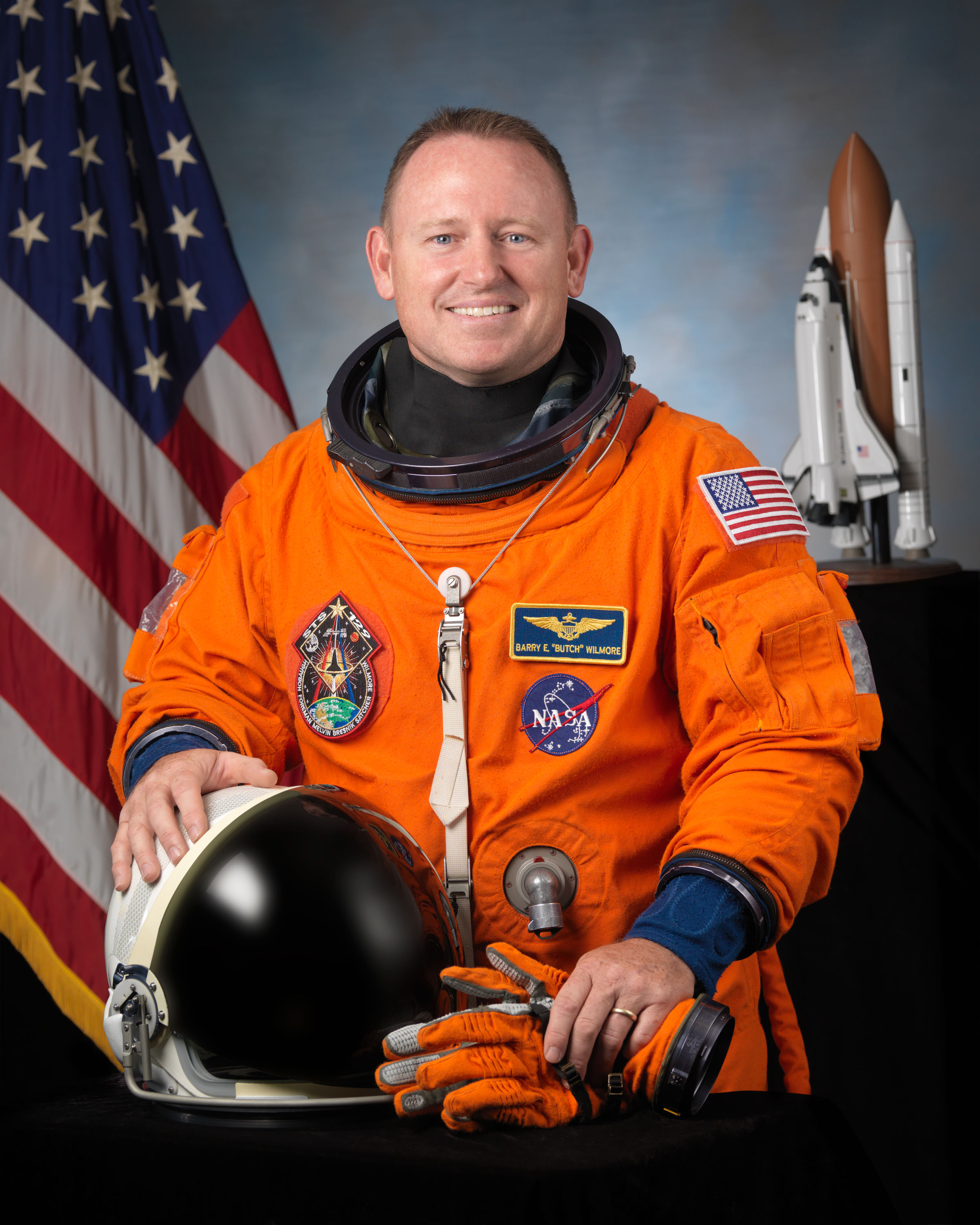
- Wilmore in 2009
- Born: Barry Eugene Wilmore; December 29, 1962 (age 63); Murfreesboro, Tennessee, U.S.
- Other name: Butch
- Education: Tennessee Technological University (BS, MS); University of Tennessee, Knoxville (MS)
- Space career

NASA astronaut
- Rank: Captain, USN
- Time in space: 464 days, 8 hours, 2 minutes
- Selection: NASA Group 18 (2000)
- Total EVAs: 5
- Total EVA time: 31 hours, 2 minutes
- Missions: STS-129; Soyuz TMA-14M (Expedition 41/42); Boeing Crew Flight Test/SpaceX Crew-9 (Expedition 71/72)
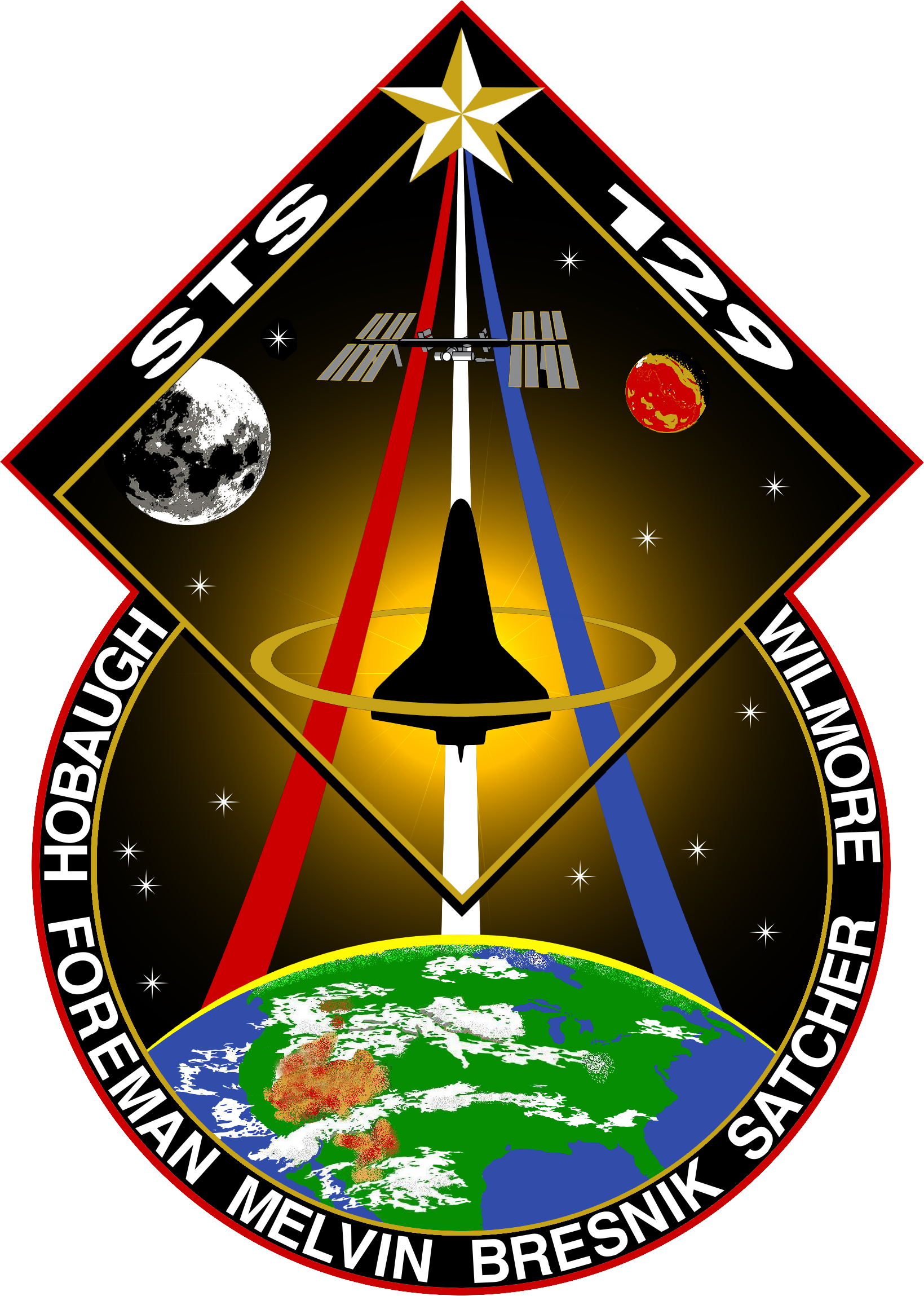
- Mission insignia
- Retired: August 6, 2025

Barry Eugene Wilmore (born December 29, 1962) is an American former NASA astronaut and retired United States Navy test pilot. He is a veteran of three spaceflights, the first of which was an 11-day Space Shuttle mission in November 2009 to the International Space Station. In total, he spent a total of 464 days off Earth and 32 hours outside of a spacecraft. Wilmore was designated as pilot with five other crew members on Space Shuttle Atlantis for the mission STS-129. He served as part of Expedition 41/42 to the International Space Station, and on June 5, 2024, returned there on the Boeing Crew Flight Test, the first crewed mission of the Boeing Starliner. On March 18, 2025, he returned to Earth on the SpaceX Dragon capsule with the other crew members of Crew-9. The crew that replaced the Boeing Crew Flight Test astronauts aboard the ISS arrived on March 16.

Prior to being selected as a NASA astronaut in July 2000, Wilmore was an experienced Navy test pilot. He also participated in the development of the T-45 Goshawk jet trainer.

== Biography ==
Wilmore was born in Murfreesboro, Tennessee and raised in Mount Juliet by his mother Faye and father Eugene. Wilmore has one sibling, a brother who resides in Franklin, Tennessee. He is married to Deanna Wilmore (née Newport) of Helenwood, Tennessee, they have two daughters. Wilmore currently lives in Houston, Texas, with his family.

Wilmore graduated from Mount Juliet High School in Mount Juliet, Tennessee. Wilmore has received a Bachelor of Science and a Master of Science degree from Tennessee Tech in electrical engineering, and a Master of Science in Aviation Systems from the University of Tennessee. Wilmore was a member, letterman, and team captain of the Tennessee Technological University football team.

== Military experience ==
Wilmore has over 8,000 hours of flight time and 663 carrier landings, all in tactical jet aircraft, and is a graduate of the United States Naval Test Pilot School (USNTPS).

During Wilmore's tenure as a fleet Naval officer and pilot, Wilmore completed four operational deployments, flying the A-7E and F/A-18 aircraft from the decks of the aircraft carriers USS Forrestal (CV-59), USS John F. Kennedy (CV-67), USS Enterprise (CVN-65) and USS Dwight D. Eisenhower (CVN-69). He has flown missions in support of Operations Desert Shield, Desert Storm and Southern Watch over the skies of Iraq, as well as missions over Bosnia in support of United States and NATO interests. Wilmore successfully completed 21 combat missions during Operation Desert Storm while operating from USS John F. Kennedy. Wilmore's most recent operational deployment was aboard USS Dwight D. Eisenhower with the "Blue Blasters" of Strike Fighter Squadron 34 (VFA-34), an F/A-18 squadron based at Naval Air Station Oceana, Virginia.

As a Navy test pilot, Wilmore participated in all aspects of the initial development of the T-45 jet trainer to include initial carrier landing certification and high angle of attack flight tests. His test tour also included a stint at USNTPS as a systems and fixed wing "Flight Test" instructor. Prior to his selection to NASA, Wilmore was on exchange to the Air Force as a "Flight Test" instructor at the U.S. Air Force Test Pilot School at Edwards Air Force Base, California.

== NASA experience ==
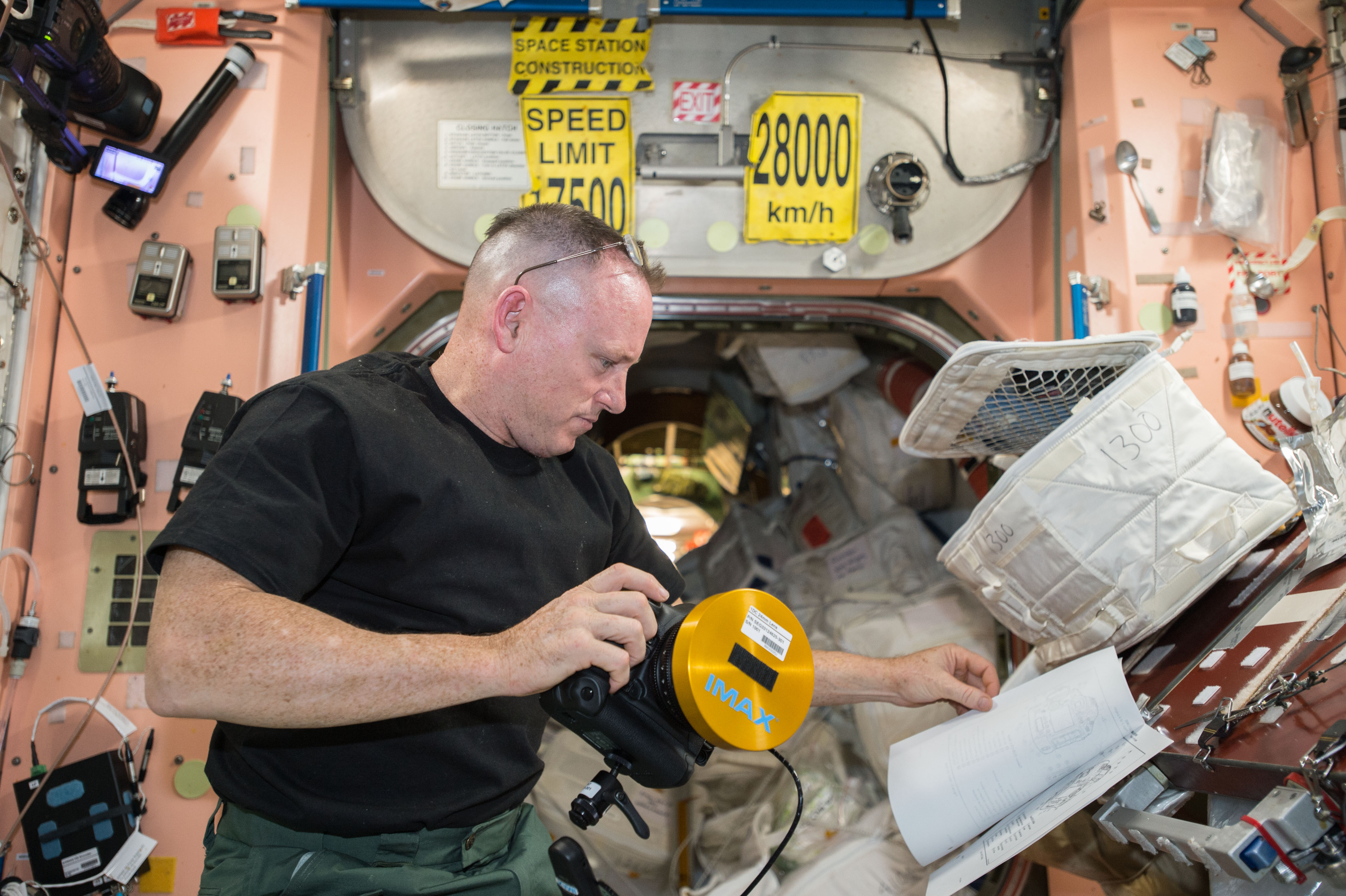
Wilmore is shown inside Node 1 of the ISS reading an instruction manual on using a Canon EOS-1D C camera.

Wilmore was selected as a pilot by NASA in July 2000 and reported for training that August 2000. Following the completion of two years of training and evaluation, Wilmore was assigned technical duties representing the Astronaut Office on all propulsion systems issues including the Space Shuttle Main Engines, solid rocket motor, external tank, and also served on the astronaut support team that traveled to the Kennedy Space Center, Florida, in support of launch and landing operations.

=== STS-129 ===
In 2009, Wilmore piloted the Space Shuttle Atlantis for the STS-129 mission to the International Space Station.

=== Expedition 41/42 ===
Wilmore returned to space in September 2014 as a member of the Soyuz TMA-14M long duration International Space Station crew. During this mission, humans manufactured off world for the first time. The International Space Station's 3-D printer, designed and built by Made In Space, Inc., was used to print a tool with a design file transmitted from the ground to the printer. The tool was a ratchet wrench needed by Wilmore, who would have had to wait for the tool to be delivered on the next supply mission from Earth. The wrench was later returned to the ground for analysis and testing, along with the other parts printed in space.

=== Boeing Crew Flight Test ===
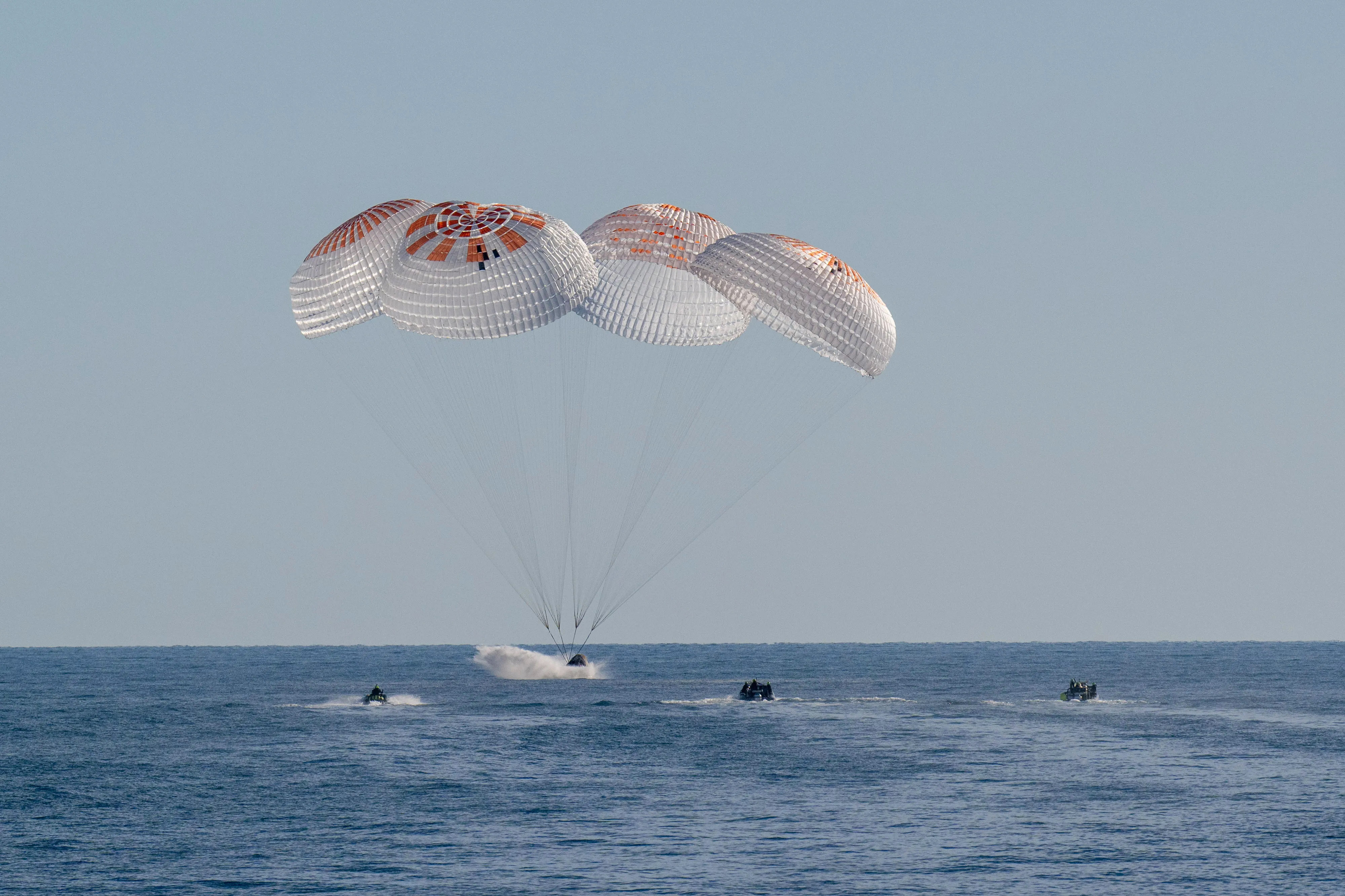
NASA astronauts - retired Navy Capts Suni Williams & Butch Wilmore, Space Force Col. Nick Hague - and Roscosmos cosmonaut Aleksandr Gorbunov land in a Dragon spacecraft off the coast of Tallahassee, FL., March 18, 2025.

On October 7, 2020, NASA and Boeing announced Wilmore would join astronauts Michael Fincke and Nicole Mann for NASA's Boeing Crew Flight Test (CFT), the inaugural crewed flight of the CST-100 Starliner launching to the International Space Station in 2021. On April 18, 2022, NASA said that it has not finalized which of the cadre of Starliner astronauts, including Wilmore, Fincke, and Sunita Williams, would fly on the Crewed Flight Test mission or the first operational Starliner mission. On June 16, 2022, NASA confirmed that CFT will be a two-person flight test, consisting of Wilmore and Williams. On June 5, 2024, Starliner was launched successfully to orbit with Williams as the spacecraft's pilot. On June 6, Starliner docked to the ISS after over a day in space.

The mission was meant to last eight days, ending with a landing in the southwestern United States on June 14. However, the capsule's thrusters malfunctioned as Starliner docked with the ISS. Despite months of testing, NASA felt it was not able to understand why the thrusters malfunctioned and decided that it was too risky to return Wilmore and Williams to Earth aboard Starliner. The Boeing Starliner spacecraft returned uncrewed on September 6, 2024, and landed intact at White Sands Space Harbor, New Mexico at 12:01 a.m., September 7, after three months in space docked to the ISS. In December 2024, it was announced that Wilmore and Williams would return to Earth no earlier than late March 2025 on a SpaceX Dragon capsule.

On January 30, 2025, Williams and Wilmore were scheduled to begin the station's 274th spacewalk, retrieving hardware from the exterior of the International Space Station.

On March 18, 2025, Williams and Wilmore finally returned to Earth on the SpaceX Dragon capsule with the other crew members of Crew-9.

On August 6, 2025, NASA announced Wilmore's retirement from the agency.

=== Ministry ===
He is an elder at Providence Baptist Church in Pasadena, Texas.

== Personal life ==
Wilmore is a Christian. During a press conference on March 31, 2025, he said that it was vital for him to continuously connect with his faith and church family, and this is why, while in orbit, he continued to regularly attend remote Sunday services streamed from Providence Baptist Church in Pasadena, Texas and Grace Baptist Church in Mount Juliet. He serves as an elder at Providence Baptist. In July 2025, Wilmore spoke at the "Astronaut Encounter" event held at the Ark Encounter in Kentucky and organized by the creationist ministry Answers in Genesis. During the event he stated that the Bible is "absolutely factual" in matters relating to science and criticized scientific theories involving deep time.

On March 3, 2026, Wilmore announced his intent to run in the 2026 Tennessee gubernatorial election as a Republican. However, he withdrew from the race days later, stating his candidacy was never official.

== Awards and honors ==
Barry Wilmore’s Personal Decorations Include: The Legion of Merit, The Defense Superior Service Medal, Defense Meritorious Service Medal, Two Navy Meritorious Service Medals, Five Air Medals, Three with Combat ‘V’ designation, Six Navy Commendation Medals, Three of which also hold the Combat ‘V’ designation, The NASA Distinguished Service Medal, Two NASA Space Flight Medals and Two Navy Achievement Medals and numerous Unit decorations. He has also received the Aviation Officer Candidate School (AOCS) "Distinguished Naval Graduate" award. He is also on the Initial Naval Flight Training "Commodore's List With Distinction". He has also won the U.S. Atlantic Fleet "Light Attack Wing One – Pilot Of The Year" (1991) and U.S. Atlantic Fleet "Strike Fighter Aviator of the Year" (1999). Wilmore is the recipient of the Strike Fighter Wing Atlantic "Scott Speicher Award" for Weapons Employment Excellence (1998). In 2003, Barry Wilmore was inducted to the Tennessee Technological University "Sports Hall of Fame".

== See also ==
- A Beautiful Planet – IMAX documentary film showing scenes of Earth which features Wilmore and other ISS astronauts.

Preceded by Maksim Surayev	ISS Expedition Commander; November 10, 2014, to March 10, 2015	Succeeded by Terry W. Virts
