= Boeing Crew Flight Test =

First crewed launch of the Boeing Starliner

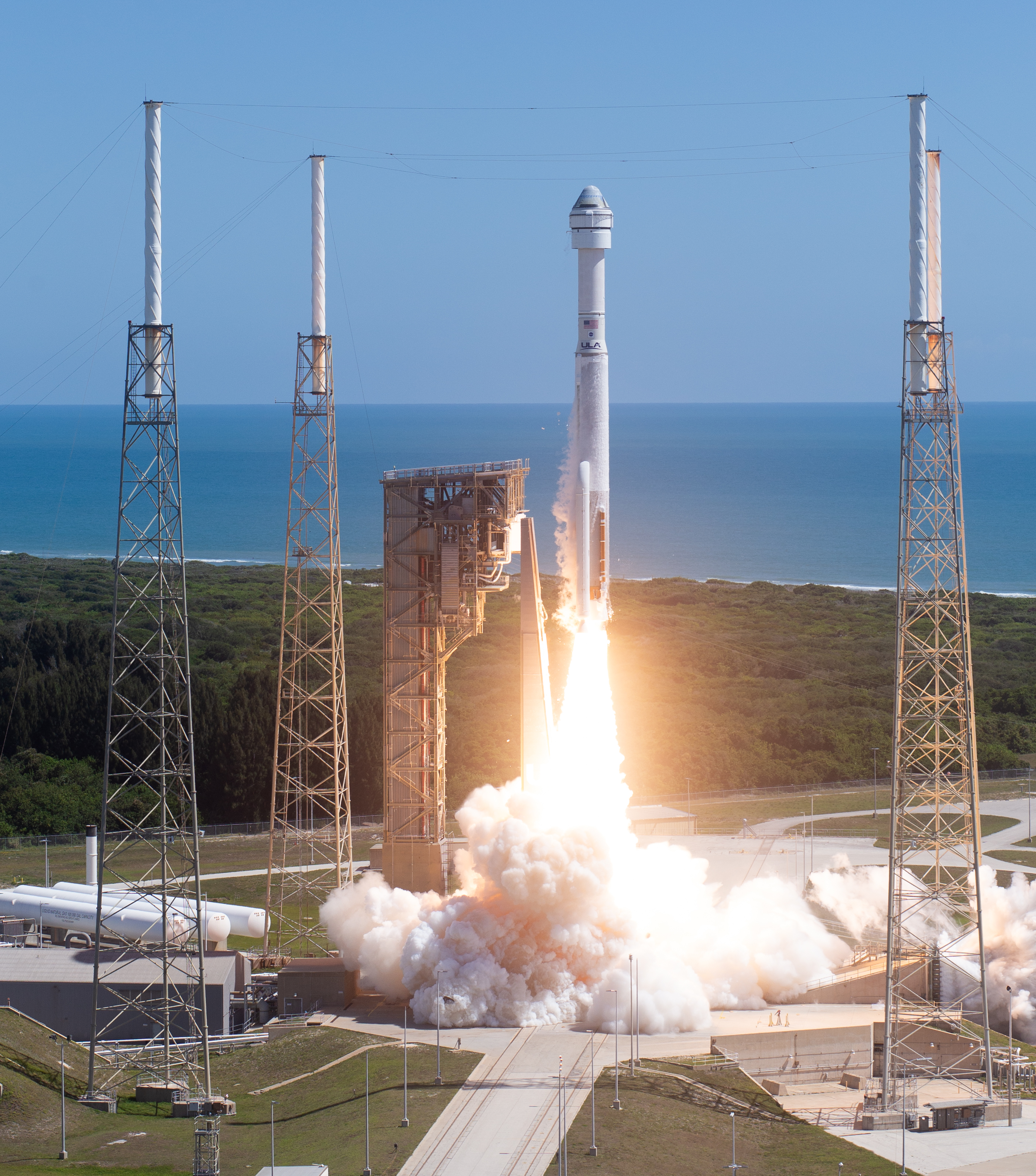
- Boeing Starliner Calypso launches on the Crew Flight Test atop an Atlas V rocket
- Names: Boe-CFT
- Mission type: Flight test
- Operator: Boeing Defense, Space & Security
- COSPAR ID: 2024-109A
- SATCAT no.: 59968
- Website: nasa.gov/boeing-crewflighttest
- Mission duration: Planned: 8 days Actual: 93 days, 13 hours and 9 minutes
- Orbits completed: 1,464

Spacecraft properties
- Spacecraft: Boeing Starliner Calypso
- Spacecraft type: Boeing Starliner
- Manufacturer: Boeing Defense, Space & Security

Crew
- Crew size: 2
- Launching: Barry E. Wilmore; Sunita Williams
- Landing: None

Start of mission
- Launch date: 5 June 2024, 14:52:15 UTC (10:52:15 am EDT)
- Rocket: Atlas V N22 (Note: N22 designates that the Atlas V has no payload fairing, two solid rocket boosters, and two Centaur second-stage engines.) (AV-085)
- Launch site: Cape Canaveral, SLC‑41
- Contractor: United Launch Alliance (Note: Boeing owns a 50% stake in ULA. Lockheed Martin owns the other 50%.)

End of mission
- Landing date: 7 September 2024, 04:01:35 UTC (6 September, 10:01:35 pm MDT)
- Landing site: White Sands Space Harbor

Orbital parameters
- Reference system: Geocentric orbit
- Regime: Low Earth orbit
- Perigee altitude: 315 km (196 mi)
- Apogee altitude: 324 km (201 mi)
- Inclination: 51.66°

Docking with ISS
- Docking port: Harmony forward
- Docking date: June 6, 2024, 17:34 UTC
- Undocking date: September 6, 2024, 22:04 UTC
- Time docked: 92 days, 4 hours, 30 minutes
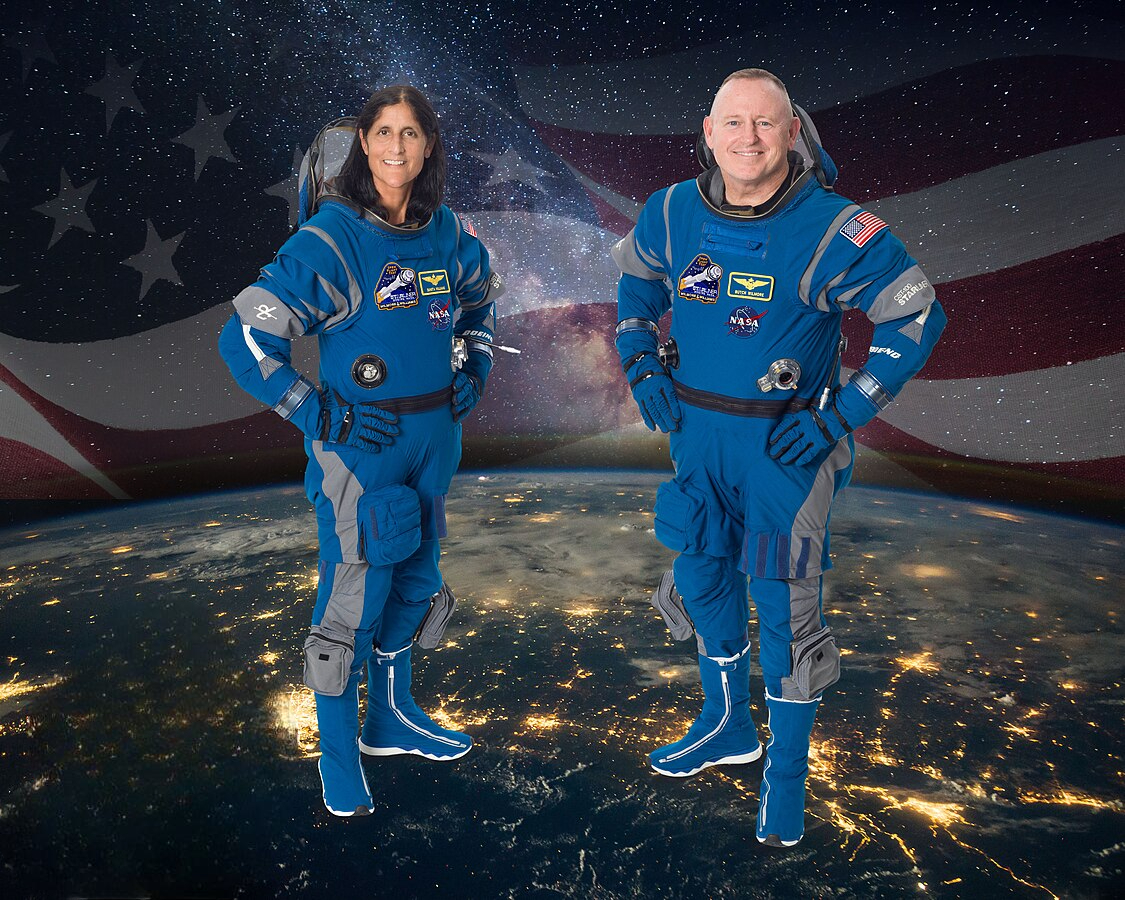
- Boeing Crew Flight Test mission patch Williams (left) and Wilmore (right) Commercial Crew Development Boeing Starliner flights

Boeing Crew Flight Test (Boe-CFT) was the first crewed mission of the Boeing Starliner capsule. Launched on June 5, 2024, the mission flew a crew of two NASA astronauts, Barry E. Wilmore and Sunita Williams, from Cape Canaveral Space Force Station to the International Space Station. The mission was meant to last eight days, ending on June 14 with a landing in the American Southwest. However, Starliner's thrusters malfunctioned as it approached the ISS. After more than two months of investigation, NASA decided it was too risky to return Wilmore and Williams to Earth aboard Starliner. Instead, the Boeing spacecraft returned uncrewed on September 7, 2024, and successfully landed at the White Sands Space Harbor in New Mexico, although it experienced a thruster failure that left the capsule without fault tolerance. The astronauts rode down aboard SpaceX Crew-9 on March 18, 2025.

Originally scheduled for launch in 2017, Boe-CFT experienced numerous delays. The spacecraft's two preceding uncrewed orbital flight tests, Boe‐OFT and Boe‐OFT‐2, were conducted in 2019 and 2022 respectively.

An investigation report released in February 2026 retroactively classified the mission as a Type A mishap, NASA's most severe failure category, typically reserved for missions involving loss of vehicle or life. The report cited hardware failures, qualification deficiencies, leadership errors, and organizational shortcomings that created risks inconsistent with NASA's human spaceflight safety standards. Administrator Jared Isaacman said that while the spacecraft has design and engineering deficiencies requiring correction, he was most troubled by the failures in decision-making and leadership at both NASA and Boeing.

== Pre-mission delays ==
The first uncrewed test, Boe‐OFT, originally planned for 2017, was delayed by development problems. It launched in 2019, but software errors prevented Starliner from reaching the ISS during that flight, precipitating delays to subsequent flights. Boe‐OFT‐2, the second uncrewed test flight attempt, was scrubbed in 2021 by valve problems. It finally flew in 2022 and met all flight objectives. In August 2023, Boeing announced that the third flight—the first crewed one—would be delayed at least to March 2024 due to weakness in certain joints within the parachute system and potentially combustible materials in the wiring harnesses. Boeing underwent multiple investigations before another flight test would be permitted.

Starliner was placed atop the Atlas V launch vehicle on April 16, 2024, but the mission's launch was repeatedly postponed by technical problems. An oxygen valve problem on United Launch Alliance's (ULA) Atlas V rocket scrubbed the first launch attempt on May 7. A second launch attempt on June 1 was scrubbed when a ground computer failed. Subsequent delays were caused by helium leaks in the Starliner's service module; helium leaks would continue to be a problem throughout the mission. The third launch attempt on June 5 at 14:52:15 UTC (10:52:15 am EDT local time at the launch site) was successful.

== Capsule ==
Boe-CFT was the second mission for the Starliner Calypso capsule. NASA announced that Boeing prepared to reassemble the vehicle for flight, following multiple checkouts, for the CFT mission in August 2020, and that new parachutes and airbags would be fitted. The Boe-CFT capsule's docking system was modified to accommodate the new re-entry cover, which debuted on the Boe-OFT‐2 test flight.

== Crew ==
Because of the delays, crew assignments were changed several times after the initial assignments in 2018. Nicole Mann was initially assigned to this mission, which would have made her the first woman to fly on the maiden crewed flight of an orbital spacecraft, but she was subsequently reassigned to the SpaceX Crew-5 mission, becoming the first female commander of a NASA Commercial Crew Program launch. For medical reasons, Eric Boe, who was originally assigned to the mission in August 2018 as the pilot, was replaced by Michael Fincke on January 22, 2019. Boeing astronaut Chris Ferguson was originally assigned to the flight as commander, but he was replaced by NASA astronaut Barry E. Wilmore on October 7, 2020. Ferguson cited family reasons for the replacement. Matthew Dominick replaced him on the backup crew.

On April 18, 2022, NASA said that it had not finalized which of the cadre of Starliner astronauts, including Barry E. Wilmore, Michael Fincke, and Sunita Williams, would fly on this mission or the first operational Starliner mission. On June 16, 2022, NASA confirmed that this CFT (Crewed Flight Test) mission would be a two-person flight test crewed by Wilmore and Williams; Fincke trained as the backup. Williams is the first woman to fly on a maiden crewed flight of an orbital spacecraft type. (Note: Judith Resnik was the first female crew member on the maiden flight of an orbital spacecraft, the Space Shuttle Discovery; for a suborbital spacecraft and suborbital spacecraft type, similar feats were accomplished by Wally Funk on Blue Origin NS-16 mission of New Shepard.)

Prime crew
Position	Launching astronaut	Landing astronaut
Commander	Barry E. Wilmore; Expedition 71/72; Third and last spaceflight	None
Pilot	Sunita Williams; Expedition 71/72; Third and last spaceflight	None
When the Boeing Crew Flight Test mission launched, Wilmore and Williams were called ISS visitors. However, due to their extended stay, NASA later formally added them to the Expedition 71/72 crew.

Backup crew
Position	Astronaut
Commander	Michael Fincke

== Mission ==
=== Overview ===
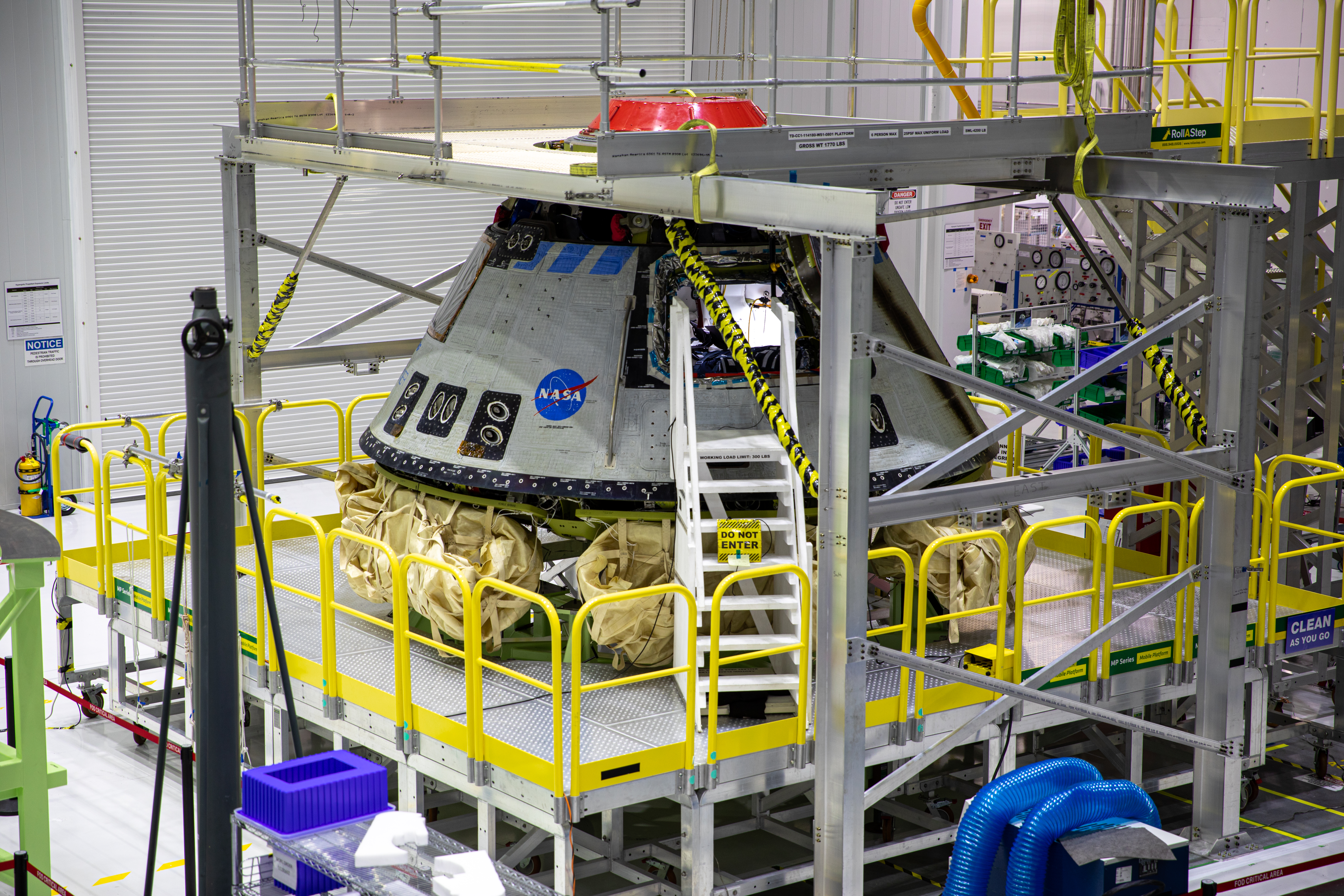
Calypso being processed at Boeing's Commercial Crew and Cargo Processing Facility in January 2020

The third launch of the Atlas V N22 variant launched Starliner with a crew of two. The vehicle docked with the International Space Station and was supposed to return to Earth for a ground landing in the southwestern United States. Originally intended as an eight-day mission, Starliner encountered problems with the propulsion system prior to docking with ISS. The mission was extended several times to allow for analysis, and NASA eventually decided to leave the crew aboard ISS and return Starliner to Earth without the crew after three months in space. The crew returned on SpaceX Crew-9.

Boe-CFT was the first launch of a crewed spacecraft by an Atlas V launch vehicle. It was the first launch of a crewed spacecraft utilizing a member of the Atlas family of launch vehicles since Mercury-Atlas 9 flown by Gordon Cooper in May 1963 and the first launch of a crewed spacecraft from Cape Canaveral Space Force Station since that of Apollo 7 in October 1968.

The uncrewed Starliner made a ground landing at White Sands in New Mexico.

=== Launch ===
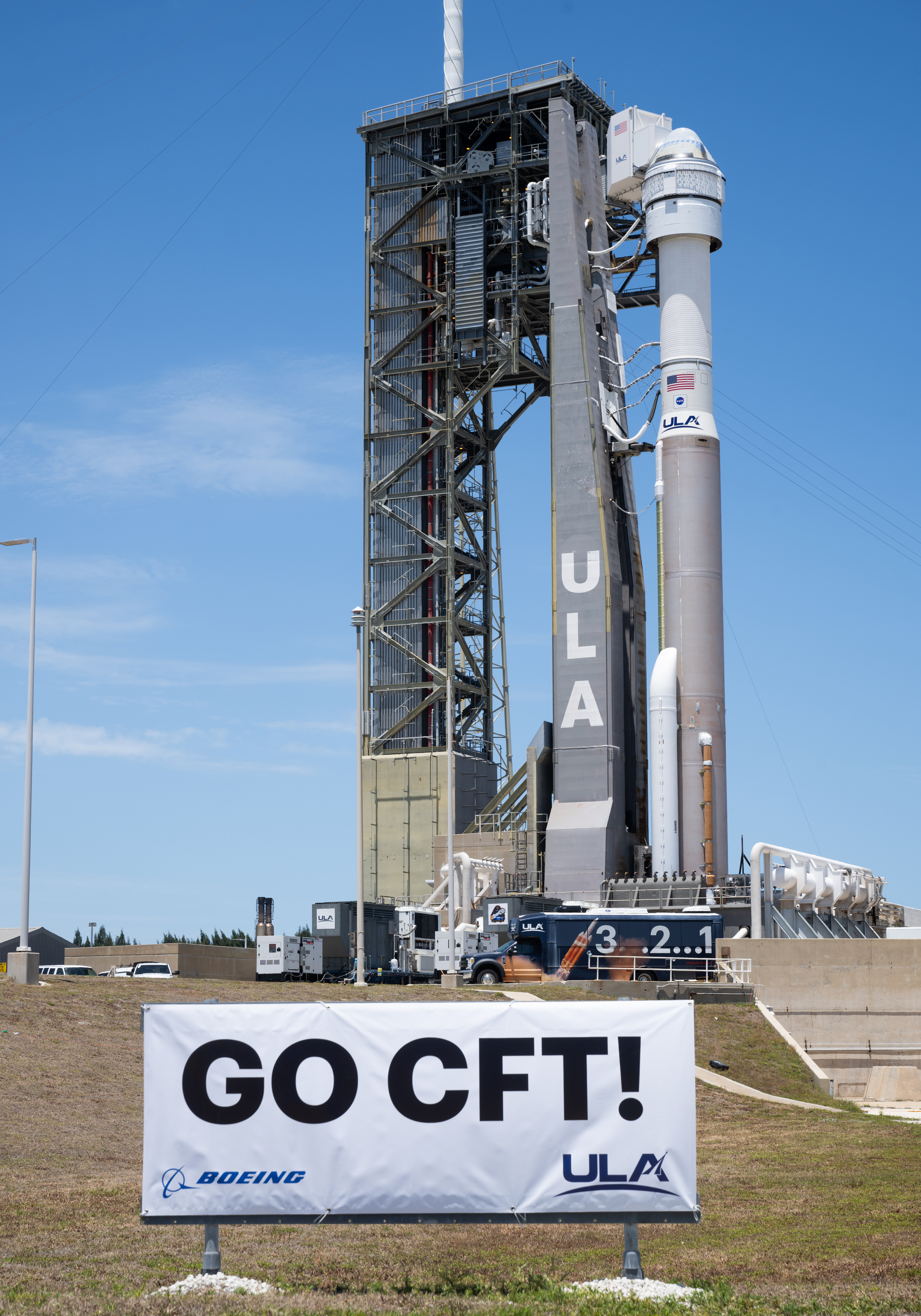
Starliner capsule stacked on top the Atlas V rocket prior to launch

In 2023, following the discovery of a technical problem with the spacecraft's parachute system and a flammability concern on the spacecraft's wiring, CFT was delayed to no earlier than March 2024. In November 2023, NASA announced that the mission was on track for an April 2024 launch, with most of the flammable material removed from the spacecraft and a drop-test of the redesigned parachute system planned for January 2024. This test was successful, allowing NASA and Boeing to proceed into launch preparations. In February 2024, the Atlas V rocket was moved into ULA's Vertical Integration Facility at Space Launch Complex-41, starting preparations for stacking ahead of the launch. In March 2024, the launch was rescheduled from April 22 to early May due to scheduling conflicts on the ISS, with a launch date of May 6 announced in early April. Work on the Starliner spacecraft inside Boeing's production facility was completed on April 15, and the spacecraft was moved to the launch pad and stacked on top the Atlas V rocket the following day. The crew arrived at Kennedy Space Center on April 25, and on the same day the mission concluded its Flight Test Readiness Review, officially approving the mission to proceed. On May 2, the SpaceX Crew-8 Dragon spacecraft moved from the forward port of the ISS Harmony module to the zenith port, to make room for the CFT mission, which is only approved to dock on the forward port. Following the completion of ULA's Launch Readiness Review, the Atlas V rocket rolled to its launch pad on May 4.

==== May 6, 2024, attempt ====
The first attempt to launch CFT, on May 6, 2024, was scrubbed around T−2 hours before launch due to a chattering oxygen pressure relief valve on the rocket's Centaur upper stage. While this problem had been seen in previous Atlas V flights and could be resolved simply by closing and reopening the valve, flight rules prohibited doing so with crew on board, which forced the decision to scrub the launch. The next day, the launch team determined that the valve had opened so many times it would need to be replaced, delaying the launch to May 17 as the rocket had to be rolled back to its Vertical Integration Facility. Meanwhile, in an unrelated problem, NASA and Boeing discovered a small helium leak on Starliner's propulsion system, which delayed the launch further to allow the teams to assess the situation. The delay was so lengthy, Wilmore flew back to Houston to spend additional time in the Starliner flight simulator to keep his skills fresh.

==== June 1, 2024, attempt ====
On May 24, following several days of analysis, NASA and Boeing announced plans to launch CFT on June 1 without repairing the helium leak, determining that the spacecraft was safe to fly even if the leak rate worsened by many times. This review also uncovered a "design vulnerability" in the propulsion system that could prevent the spacecraft from completing a deorbit burn in a very remote failure mode; engineers then devised a new reentry mode to employ should this failure mode occur. Astronauts Barry Wilmore and Sunita Williams after returning to Houston following the previous scrub, flew back to Kennedy Space Center on May 28. After a May 29 meeting, teams from NASA, Boeing, and ULA confirmed readiness for a June 1 launch.

In late May, the pump in the ISS urine processor assembly malfunctioned, halting the ability to convert the crew's waste back into drinkable water. NASA made the decision to place a replacement pump on the Starliner. To maintain a consistent mass and accommodate the 64-kilogram (141 lb) pump, Wilmore's and Williams' suitcases, containing personal clothes and toiletries, were removed; instead, the CFT crew was to use generic spare clothes and toiletries already aboard the ISS.

The second launch attempt, on June 1, was scrubbed 3 minutes and 50 seconds before liftoff after an automatic hold was triggered when one of three redundant ground launch sequencer computers gave slower-than-normal readings. This was found to have been caused by a faulty power supply unit connected to that computer. On June 2, a ULA team replaced the computer chassis containing this power supply and verified that the new hardware was performing normally.

==== June 5, 2024, launch ====
CFT lifted off on the Atlas V rocket on its third launch attempt, on June 5 at 10:52 am EDT. The mission was launched from ULA's SLC-41 launch site at Cape Canaveral Space Force Station, Florida, and was Atlas V's 100th flight. The rocket flew in the N22 configuration, with no payload fairing, two AJ-60A solid rocket boosters, and two RL10A-4-2 engines on the Centaur second stage. The solid rocket boosters separated from the rocket 2 minutes and 20 seconds after liftoff. The core stage continued firing until 4 minutes and 28 seconds after launch and was separated shortly thereafter. The Centaur second stage then began firing until 11 minutes and 52 seconds after launch. The crew reported that the second stage imparted a surging motion, but that it was not uncomfortable. The Starliner spacecraft separated from the second stage about 15 minutes after liftoff. To maximize safety, the spacecraft was placed in a sub-orbital trajectory by the rocket and used its own thrusters to enter orbit about 31 minutes after launch. The rocket placed the spacecraft into a "perfect" orbital insertion.

==== Launch attempt summary ====
Note: times are local to the launch site (Eastern Daylight Time).

Attempt	Planned	Result	Turnaround	Reason	Decision point	Weather go (%)	Notes
1	6 May 2024, 10:34:14 pm	Scrubbed	—	Technical	6 May 2024, 8:32 pm (T−02:01:30)	95	Centaur LOX valve problem
2	1 Jun 2024, 12:25:40 pm	Scrubbed	25 days 13 hours 51 minutes	Technical	1 Jun 2024, 12:22 pm (T−00:03:35)	90	Ground launch sequencer computer fault
3	5 Jun 2024, 10:52:15 am	Success	3 days 22 hours 27 minutes			90	

CFT mission launch events
Time	Event
L−6:00:00	Atlas/Centaur fuel/oxidizer loading begins
L−4:30:00	Crew suit-up begins
L−4:00:00	Atlas/Centaur fuel/oxidizer loading complete
L−3:20:00	Crew departs for the launch pad
L−3:10:00	Crew module preparations begin
L−2:50:00	Crew arrives for boarding
L−1:20:00	Crew access hatch closed
L−0:50:00	Cabin leak checks and pressurization
L−0:18:00	Flight director verifies Starliner team go for launch
L−0:18:00	Starliner switches to internal power
L−0:11:00	Crew access arm retracted
L−0:07:00	Flight director verifies Atlas/Centaur team go for launch
L−0:07:00	Starliner configured for terminal count
L−0:05:00	Starliner configured for ascent
L−0:00:02.7	Atlas engine ignition
L−0:00:00	Solid rocket booster ignition
L+0:00:01.1	Liftoff
L+0:00:06.0	Begin pitch/yaw maneuver
L+0:01:01.7	Max q (moment of peak mechanical stress on the rocket)
L+0:01:05.3	Mach 1
L+0:02:20.4	Solid rocket booster jettison
L+0:04:28.9	Atlas booster engine cutoff (BECO)
L+0:04:34.9	Centaur separation from Atlas
L+0:04:40.9	Ascent cover jettison
L+0:04:44.9	Centaur main engine start (MES)
L+0:05:04.9	Aeroskirt jettison
L+0:11:55.4	Centaur main engine cutoff (MECO)
L+0:14:55.4	Starliner separation from Centaur

Crew walkout from the Neil Armstrong Operations and Checkout Building before launch

Crew arriving at the launch pad and entering their Starliner capsule

Video of launch from engine ignition to SRB jettison

=== Cruise and docking ===
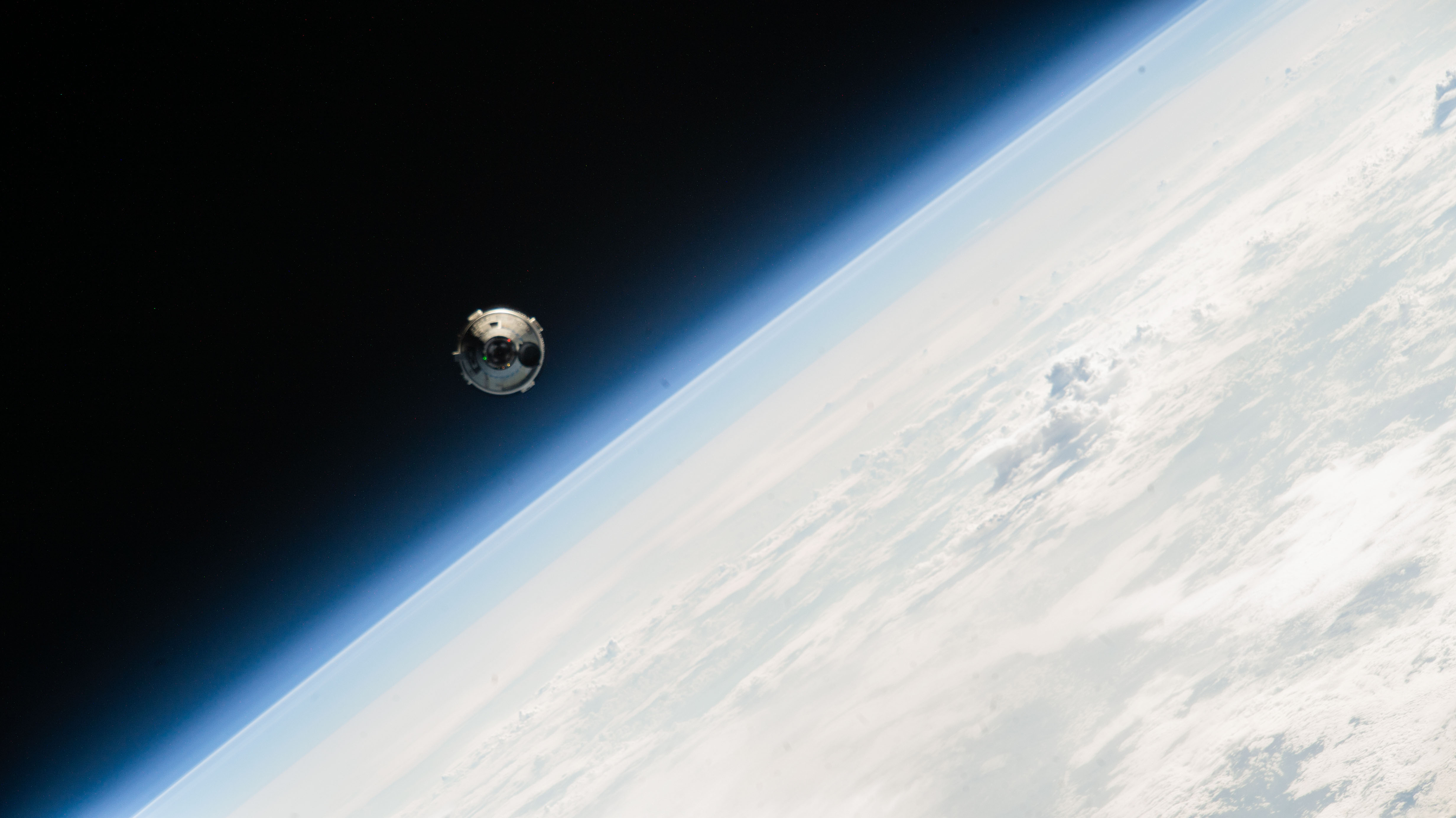
Starliner approaching the ISS during the Crew Flight Test (CFT)

In the hours after getting into orbit, the crew performed several manual maneuvering exercises, including pointing the antenna towards the Tracking and Data Relay Satellite System (TDRSS) communications satellites, pointing the solar panels towards the sun, manually using the star tracker, manually braking and accelerating the spacecraft to perform orbital maneuvers, and manually orienting the spacecraft for reentry. Although the Starliner spacecraft is designed to operate autonomously and these capabilities are not required in a nominal mission, these tests showed that the crew can take over many functions of the craft during an emergency. Wilmore said that Starliner performed exceptionally well during these initial tests, approaching that of a perfect handling qualities rating. Following these tests, the crew attempted to sleep for several hours, but reported that the cabin of the spacecraft was uncomfortably cold, with temperatures about 50 °F (10 °C), which forced them to put on their heavy spacesuits, including their boots and gloves.

Late on June 5, just before the crew's sleep time, flight controllers on the ground detected two more helium leaks in different parts of Starliner's propulsion system. To manage these leaks, flight controllers temporarily closed the two helium manifolds associated with the new leaks, which disabled six of the spacecraft's 28 reaction control system thrusters. The leaks were described as small and the spacecraft still had plenty of helium to complete its mission, so managers gave permission to dock. The helium manifolds were reopened during rendezvous and docking and were subsequently closed once the spacecraft docked, as is standard procedure. A fourth leak, smaller than the other three, was detected after docking. NASA and Boeing's managers acknowledged that this appeared to be a systemic problem with the propulsion system, contrary to their expectations before the mission that the first helium leak was an isolated problem caused by one defective seal.

As Starliner approached the ISS, five of the spacecraft's eight aft-facing reaction control system (RCS) thrusters failed. After the first two thrusters failed, Wilmore took manual control, noting the vehicle was less responsive than during a test the previous day. NASA waived standard flight rules to allow docking despite the degraded conditions. Eventually, four thrusters failed, resulting in a loss of full six degrees of freedom (6DOF) attitude control. The astronauts later described the situation as "very precarious."

Wilmore could no longer fully control the capsule, but abandoning the docking attempt was not a safe option either, as the same thrusters were needed to orient Starliner for its deorbit burn and reentry. The team at NASA Mission Control (which Boeing contracted to operate the spacecraft) decided to attempt a reset—essentially a thruster reboot. Wilmore stabilized the capsule before calling down, "Hands off," allowing Mission Control to override the flight software and reactivate the failed jets. Three thrusters were reenabled, but shortly after, a fifth thruster failed. A second reset restored all but one thruster, allowing Starliner to complete its planned autonomous docking.

A post-mission investigation report released in February 2026 found that the thruster failures were most likely caused by a combination of oxidizer heating and valve seal deformation. Inside the doghouse containing the thrusters, elevated temperatures (generated by thruster firings) caused the nitrogen tetroxide oxidizer (NTO) to partially vaporize before reaching the combustion chamber, creating gas bubbles and reducing flow. At the same time, exposure to NTO, heat, and pressure caused the Teflon seals within the oxidizer valves to deform and expand, further restricting oxidizer flow to the engines. A subsequent ground investigation linked the thruster degradation specifically to the Teflon seals.

A similar problem occurred during the uncrewed OFT‐2 mission in 2022: thrusters in the same location in the spacecraft were deactivated during the approach. Mission managers believed the failure of the thrusters could be related to input data being outside some predetermined limits rather than being a software or hardware problem, although the exact cause is unknown.

During the mission, seven of the eight helium manifolds in the service module developed leaks. The investigation determined the most likely cause was incompatibility between the valve materials and NTO, combined with poorly fitting O-rings.

Starliner docked with the forward port of the ISS Harmony module on June 6 at 1:34 pm EDT, nearly 27 hours after launch, including an hour-plus delay caused by the thruster problem. Wilmore and Williams entered the station at 3:45 pm EDT, joining Expedition 71 crewmembers Jeanette Epps, Matthew Dominick, Tracy Dyson, and Michael Barratt of NASA, as well as ISS commander Oleg Kononenko, Nikolai Chub, and Alexander Grebenkin of Roscosmos.

Starliner spacecraft docking to the ISS

Crew entering the ISS

Welcoming remarks from the crew after arriving at the ISS

=== ISS stay ===
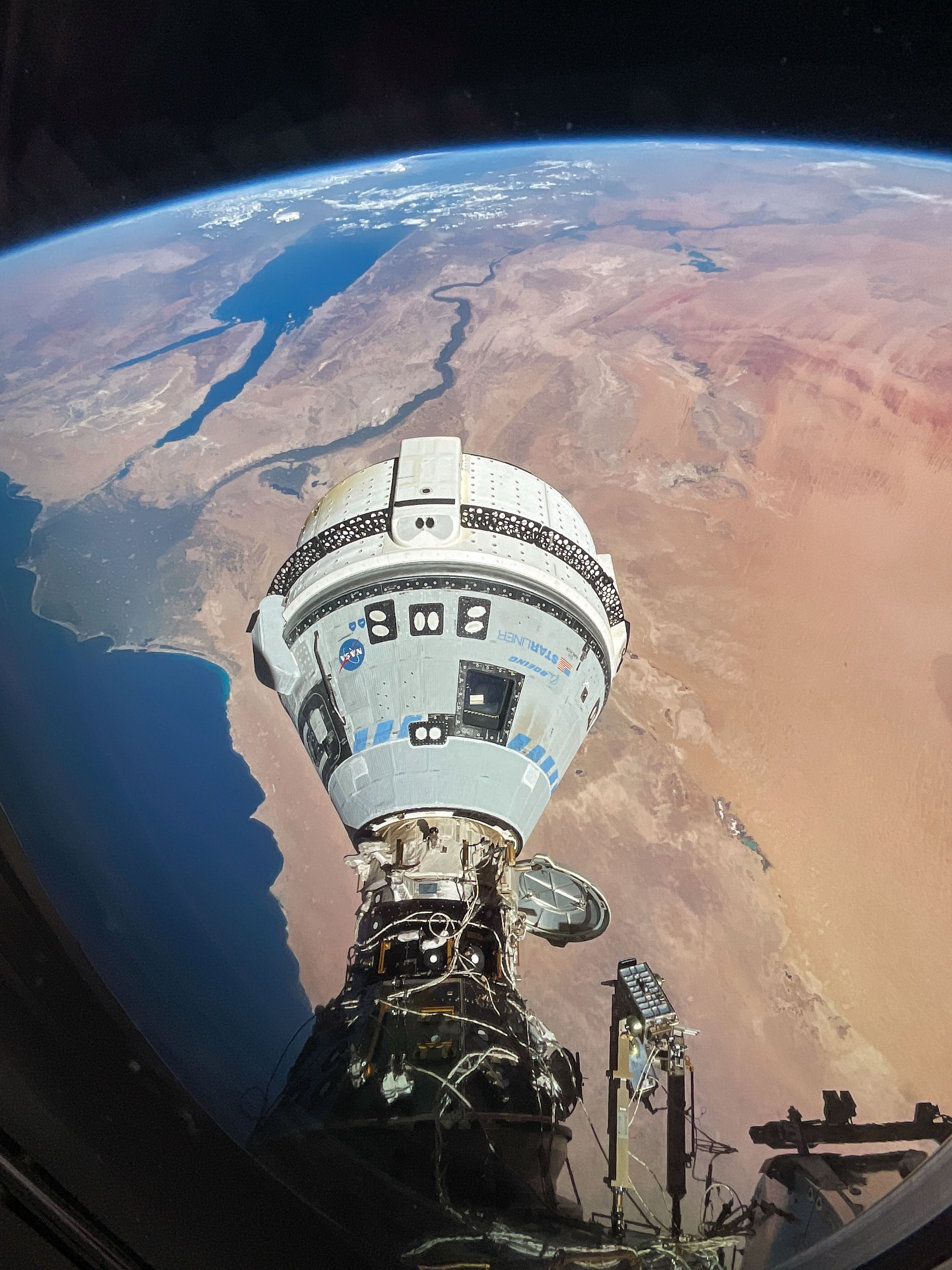
Starliner docked to the ISS as seen from the Crew-8 Dragon spacecraft

On June 7, the CFT astronauts spent their first full day aboard the ISS transferring cargo and emergency gear in and out of Starliner. They were helped by ISS crewmates Michael Barratt and Matthew Dominick. Among the items unpacked was a new pump for the station's urine processing facility, which converts urine into drinking water. It was added as a last-minute change to Starliner's cargo manifest after the station's old pump malfunctioned on May 29. By the next day, the new pump was already installed and operating properly.

On June 8, the crew tested the ability of the Starliner vehicle to act as a "safe haven" in the event of an emergency at the ISS, which includes sheltering the crew for an extended time or quickly departing the station if needed. This is a requirement for any crewed vehicle that visits the ISS. The CFT astronauts were also joined by Matthew Dominick and Tracy C. Dyson to test the living conditions on Starliner with a crew of four inside. On June 9, the CFT crew continued performing checks on Starliner as part of their flight test objectives. The spacecraft was then switched to a low power mode, in which it was intended to stay until undocking preparations at the end of the mission.

On June 10, with all their initial Starliner testing completed, the CFT crew started working on general ISS maintenance and research activities. They started their day by measuring their temperature, blood pressure, pulse, and respiratory rate. Later, Wilmore worked on the maintenance of a computer connected to the Microgravity Science Glovebox, while Williams installed hardware to support a space fire investigation. They also participated in a number of public-relations events where they talked to people on Earth, including a call to Sunita L. Williams Elementary School, located in Williams' hometown of Needham, Massachusetts. On June 11, the astronauts spent their time on biomedical activities, with Wilmore organizing the inventory of the Human Research Facility, and Williams working on procedures to collect microbe samples and sequence their genes. They also participated in an event with Tennessee Tech, Wilmore's home university. On June 12, Wilmore checked cargo in the Harmony module and worked on maintenance of the station's bathroom, while Williams continued her gene sequencing work from the day before. On June 13, the CFT crew worked to support a planned spacewalk by astronauts Matt Dominick and Tracy Dyson; they helped the pair during the suit-up process, and, once the spacewalk was canceled, helped them get out of their spacesuits. Later in the day, they took an inventory of the personal consumables they had used up to that point and worked with flight controllers to update their tablets with emergency procedures.

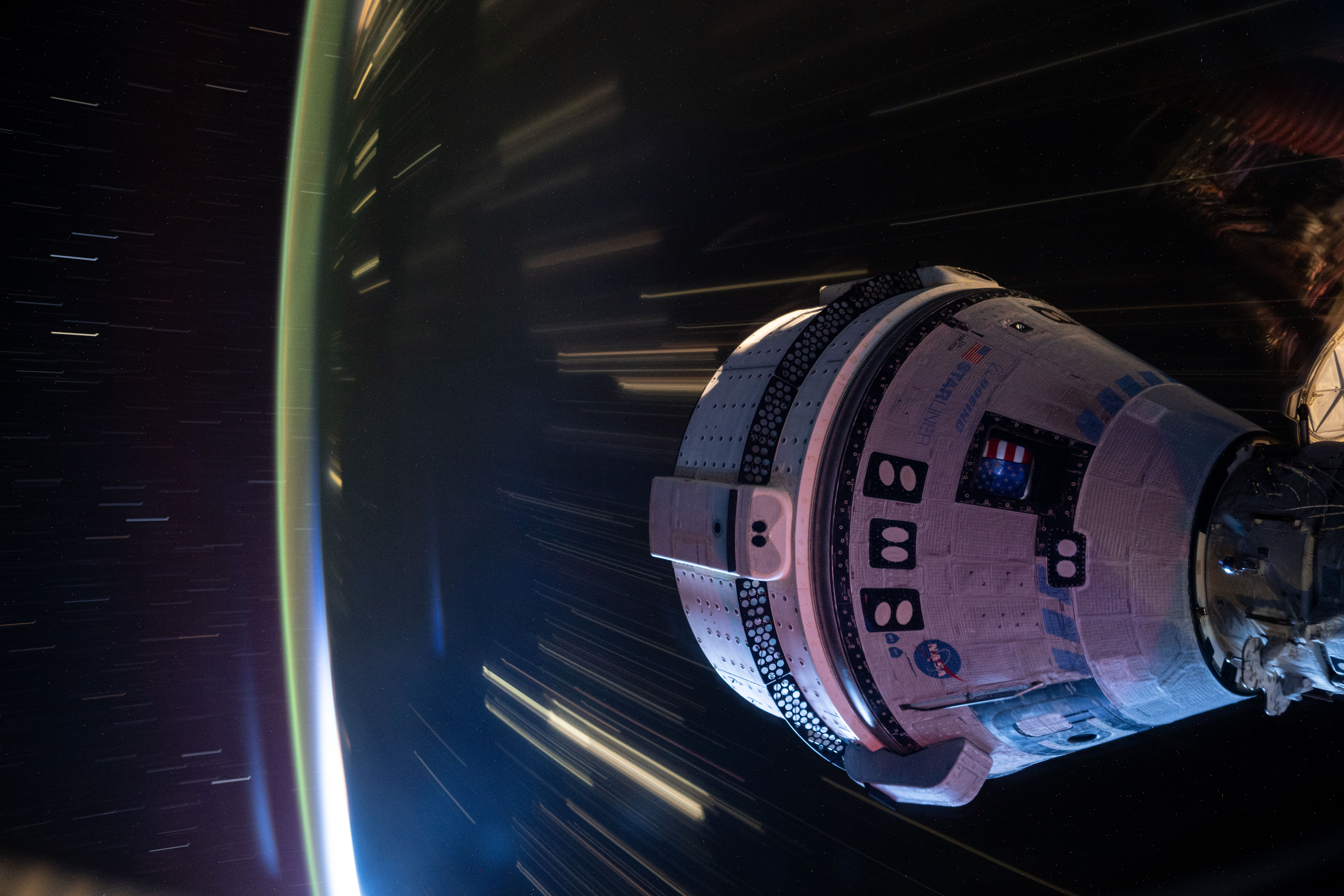
Boeing Starliner Calypso docked to the ISS during the Crew Flight Test

On June 14, after their undocking date was pushed back to June 22, the CFT astronauts had a call with Boeing mission managers to discuss the end of the mission and then entered Starliner to review the spacecraft's flight operations and procedures. On the weekend of June 15 and 16, they performed tasks related to their CFT mission and assisted the ISS crew. On June 17, Williams worked on maintenance tasks and prepared the Advanced Plant Habitat for future experiments, and on June 18 she continued working on the gene sequencing study from the prior week. Meanwhile, Wilmore spent the two days working on a study of the behavior of flowing liquids in space.

NASA said that since their arrival on June 6, Wilmore and Williams had been tasked with completing half of all hands-on research time conducted aboard the ISS, giving their crewmates more time to prepare for the departure of Northrop Grumman's Cygnus NG-20 spacecraft.

While Starliner was docked to the ISS, NASA and Boeing teams continued to assess the spacecraft's performance, especially relating to the helium leaks and RCS thruster problems. NASA delayed the end of the mission several times to continue testing the spacecraft in space; because the service module is discarded on reentry, NASA and Boeing would not have another opportunity to collect data from it. On a June 10 update, NASA reported a fifth small helium leak in the service module, plus a new problem: an RCS oxidizer isolation valve that did not close properly. On June 15, the spacecraft was powered on for a test of the RCS thrusters, during which seven of eight aft-facing thrusters performed nominally, including four of the five that had malfunctioned during docking. One thruster, which could not be restored during docking, was deemed unusable and would not be used for the remainder of the mission. This test also enabled engineers to measure the helium leaks in the spacecraft, and all five leak rates were found to have decreased. The cause of the helium and thruster problems remained unknown. NASA managers speculated that the intense "dynamic operations" during the docking sequence could have contributed to the problems.

In July, a joint NASA-Boeing team began conducting ground tests at the White Sands Missile Range in New Mexico on an RCS thruster that had been planned to be used on a future Starliner mission. The team simulated conditions that Calypso experienced from launch to docking with over 1,000 pulses, then simulated five undock-to-deorbit firing sequences with 500 pulses, including sequences with longer and more frequent pulses. These tests were completed by July 18.

During these tests, the team was able to replicate the thrust degradation that caused the thrusters to fail. When the test thruster was disassembled, the team found that a Teflon seal had been deformed. A buildup of heat appears to have caused Teflon seals in the thruster to bulge and constrict the flow of propellant. However, when the tests were replicated on the Starliner in orbit, the same problem was not seen, and even thrusters which had previously lost significant thrust performed close to normal, suggesting that the seals might not be the root cause.

After those results, at a meeting of key NASA engineers called the Program Control Board, Ken Bowersox said, "We heard from a lot of folks that had concerns." The meeting ended with no agreement that Wilmore and Williams should return to Earth on Starliner. Boeing, for its part, expressed confidence in Starliner and the belief that returning the spacecraft to Earth with the astronauts aboard was acceptable. Wilmore and Williams later admitted they privately doubted Starliner's ability to return them safely to Earth.

Amid the uncertainty, NASA delayed the August 18 launch of its SpaceX Crew-9 mission to September 24, 2024. Since Starliner occupied the required ISS docking port, it had to undock from the ISS before the launch of Crew-9. The agency also considered several return scenarios if Starliner was deemed unsafe to bring Williams and Wilmore home, including launching Crew-9 with two empty seats. However, NASA said that taking such an action would add additional risks as the Starliner would require a software update to allow it to fly autonomously.

Tour of the Starliner spacecraft docked to the ISS

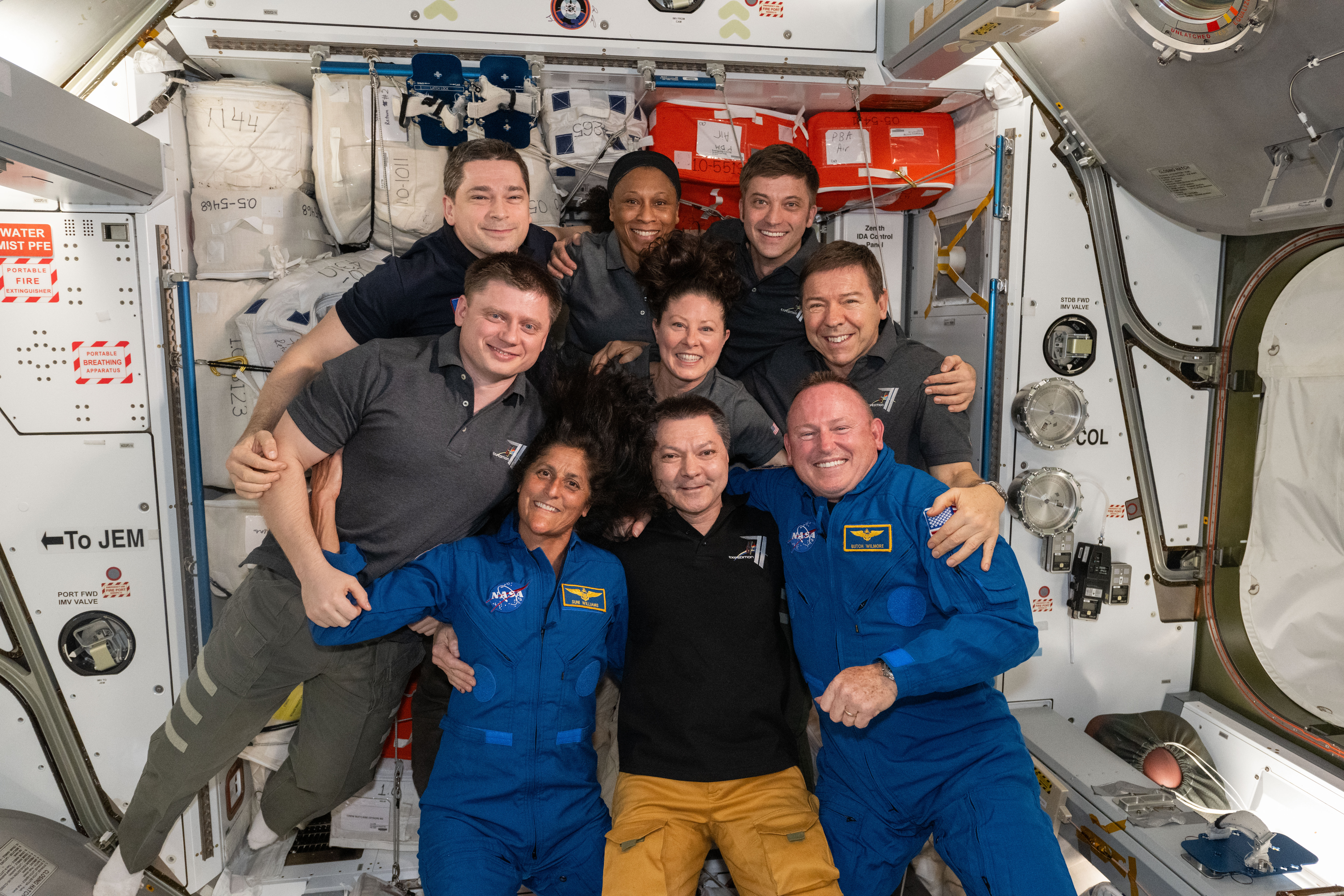
The seven Expedition 71 crew members gather with the two CFT crew members for a portrait aboard the ISS

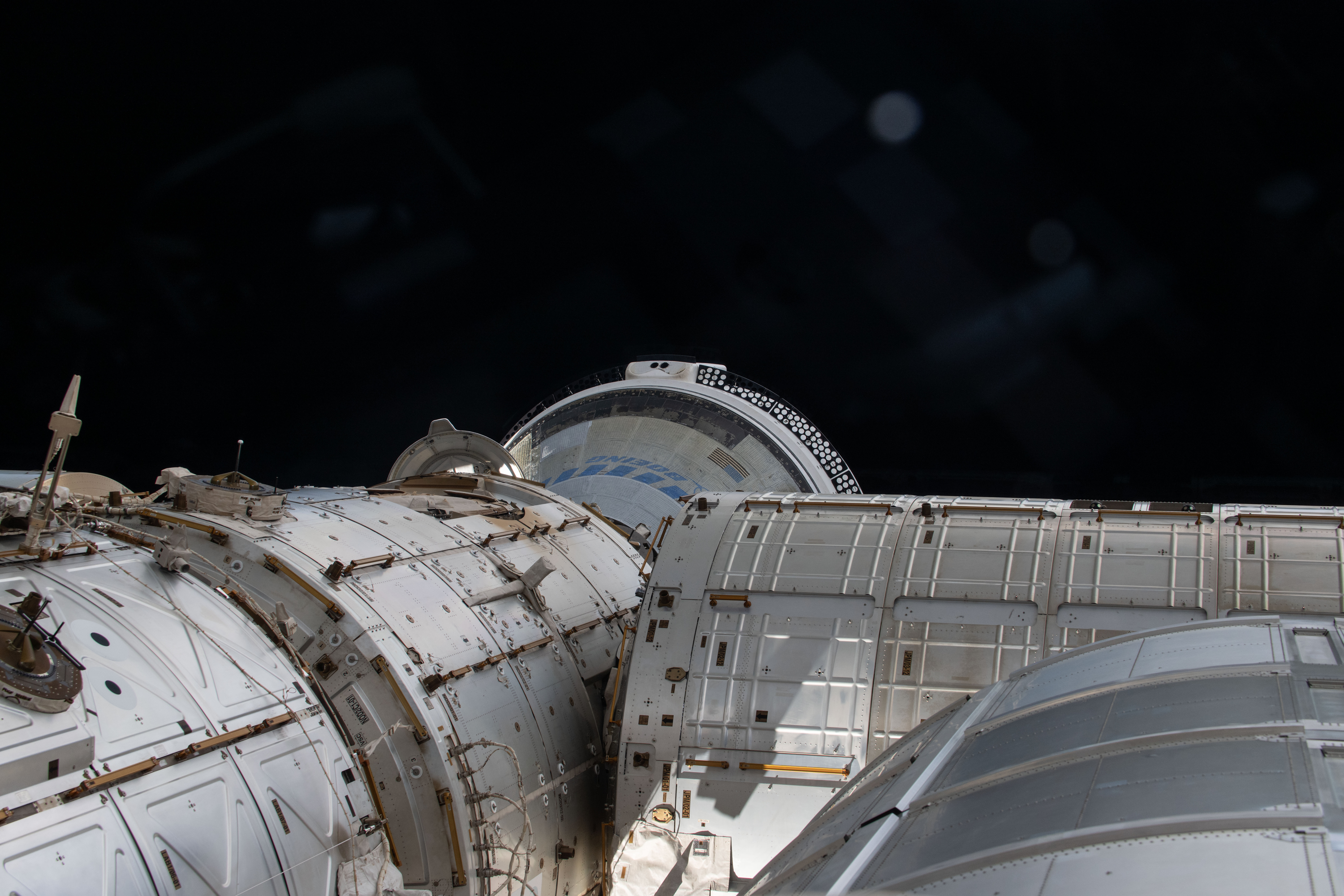
Starliner docked to the ISS as seen from the Cupola

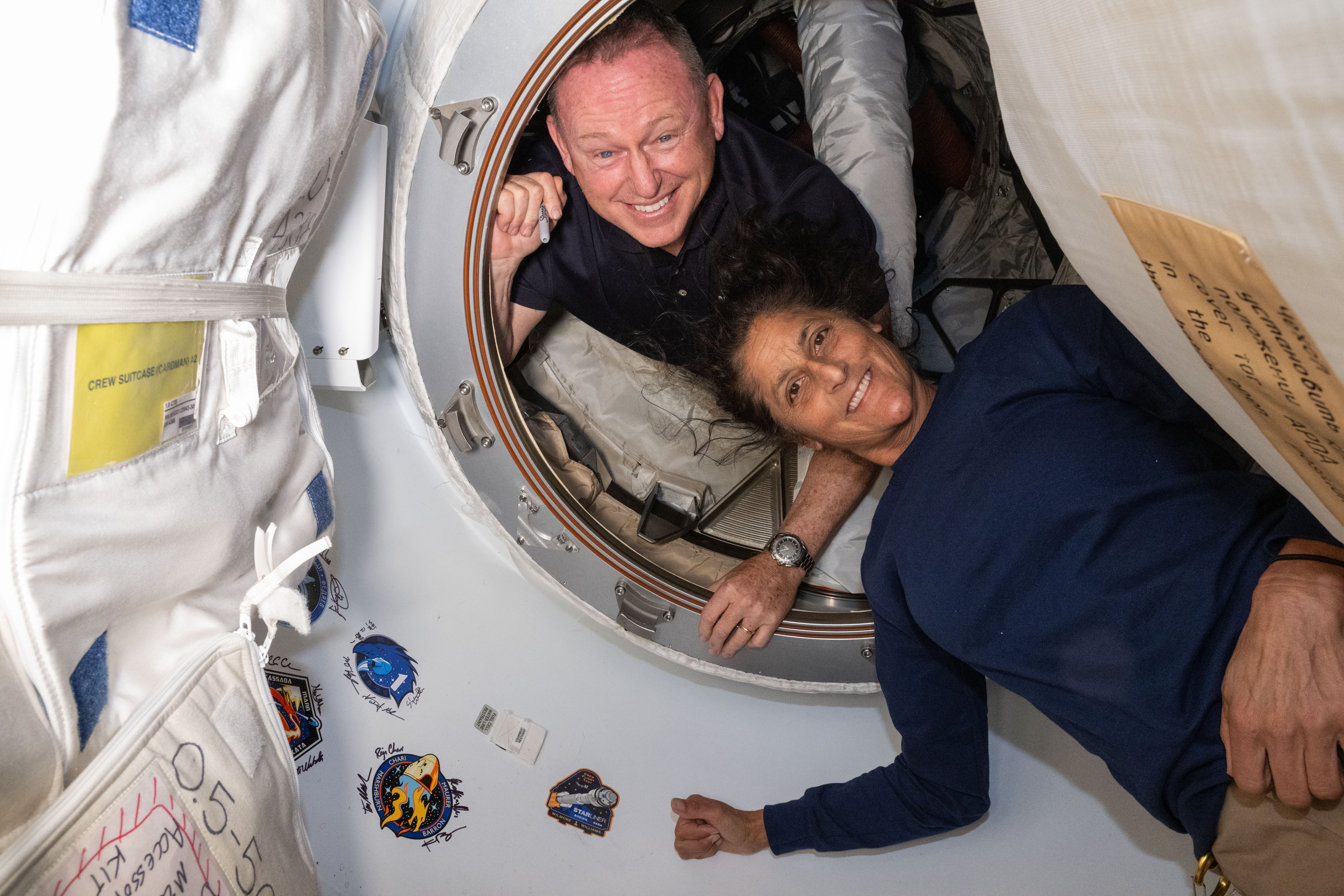
Williams and Wilmore in the vestibule that connects the ISS to Starliner

=== Uncrewed return to Earth ===
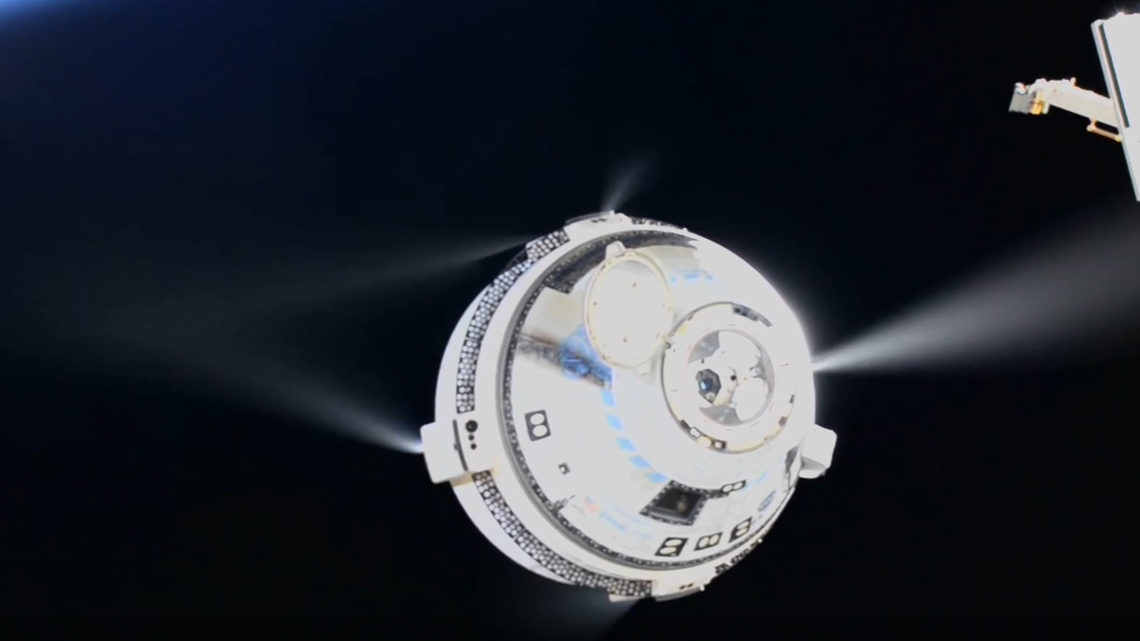
Boeing Starliner Calypso fires its thrusters as it departs the ISS.

NASA had originally planned for Starliner to undock from the ISS and return to Earth on June 14, concluding an eight-day stay. The landing was delayed several times by NASA and Boeing to investigate why the helium leaked and the maneuvering thrusters failed. On June 28, NASA announced that Starliner would not be approved to return until its thruster problems were solved, or at least better understood, or if the ISS were to experience an emergency. NASA and Boeing initially said Starliner could remain docked to the ISS for up to 45 days, but later said that the performance of its batteries would permit a stay of up to 90 days.

On August 24, NASA announced that the agency had decided it was too risky to return Wilmore and Williams to Earth aboard Starliner, and that the crew would instead return in March 2025 on a Crew Dragon, joining members of the SpaceX Crew-9 mission. That mission launched with two astronauts on board instead of four, leaving two empty seats for Williams and Wilmore.

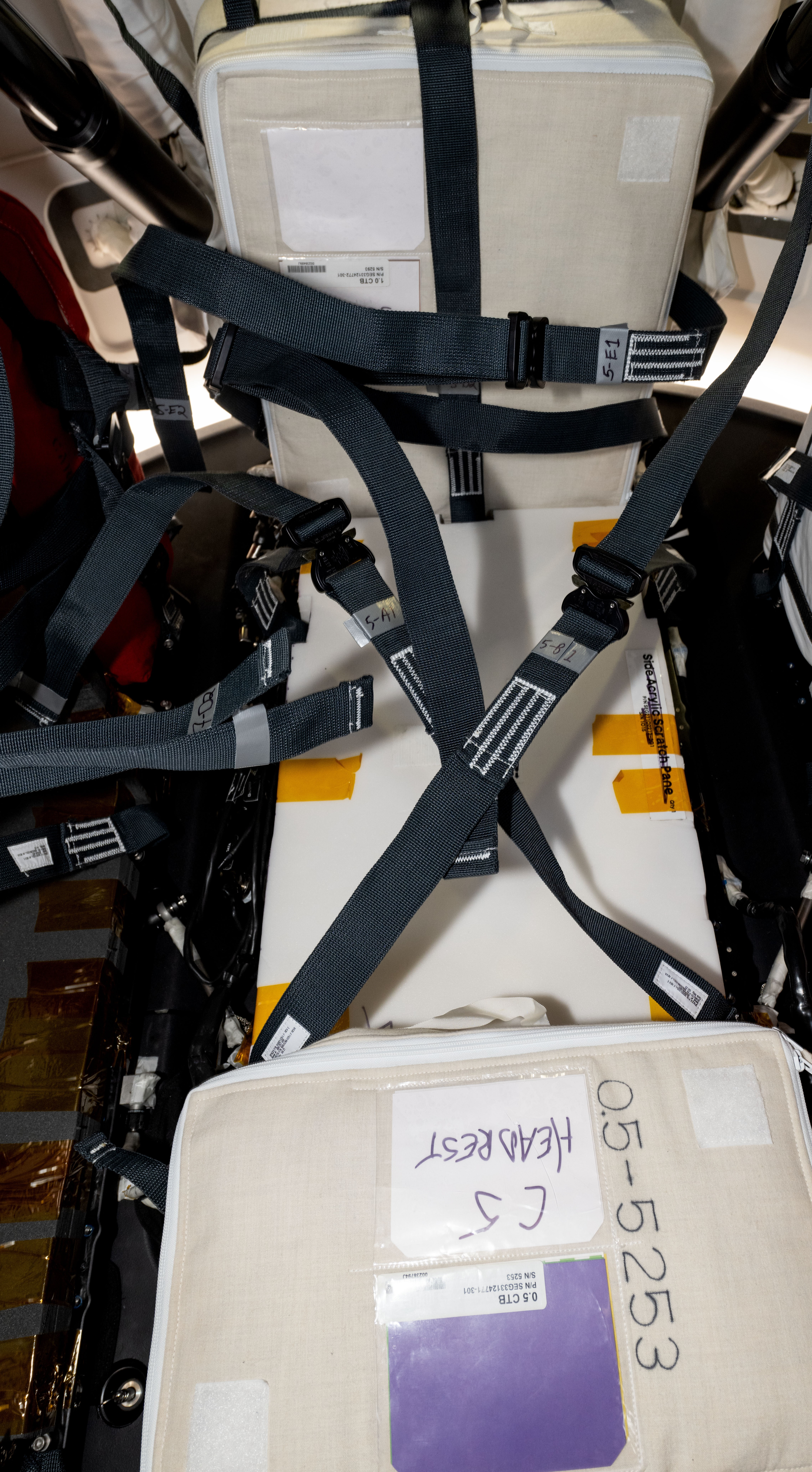
Temporary seat structure built and installed on the Crew Dragon Endeavor spacecraft using foam, straps, and other soft goods.

Because the ISS has only two IDSS ports, Starliner had to undock before Crew-9 could dock. Because each crew member must have a "lifeboat" to use if the station suffers an emergency, SpaceX developed and NASA approved an emergency evacuation configuration of the Dragon spacecraft in which up to three crew members would strap themselves to the floor of the Dragon spacecraft, where cargo is normally stored, which would be covered with foam padding.

Starliner's problems and the consequent extension of the astronauts' stay received much media attention. Boeing objected to some reporters' description of the astronauts as being "stuck" in space. After NASA decided to end the Starliner test flight without a crew on board, the company refused to answer questions from journalists, instead opting to release only brief statements. Reporters argued that NASA and Boeing should have been more transparent about the mission.

Under Starliner's original plan, the trip home from ISS would have begun with the astronauts closing the hatch and about three hours of further preparation for undocking. Once undocked, the capsule would have performed a full spiral around the station, flying above, behind, and below the station before firing the thrusters to begin the trip back to the western United States, where the capsule would have landed about six and a half hours later.

Instead, when the uncrewed Starliner undocked on 6 September at 22:04 UTC, it executed a simpler, less mechanically stressful posigrade maneuver to back Starliner away from the ISS, mostly relying on firing the forward-facing thrusters, which experienced no problems during docking. The spacecraft then executed a deorbit burn at a safe distance away from the station.

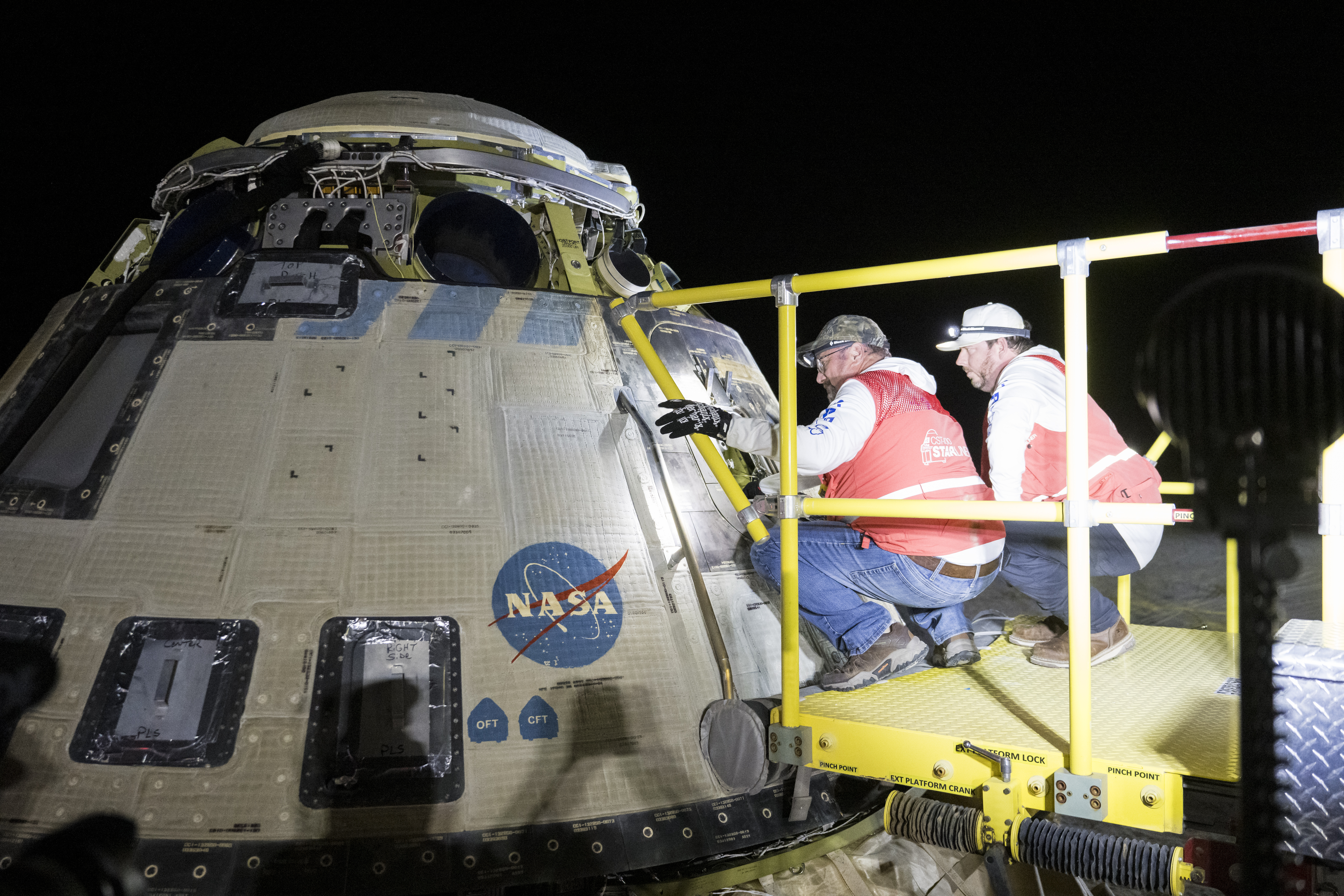
Crews inspect Boeing Starliner Calypso after landing.

Starliner reentered the atmosphere about six hours after undocking. It deployed three parachutes, slowing the capsule to about 4 miles per hour (350 ft/min; 1.8 m/s). Before reaching the ground, six airbags deployed to cushion the landing. It landed at White Sands Space Harbor in New Mexico on 7 September at 04:01:35 UTC (6 September, 10:01:35 pm MDT, local time at the landing site). All potential landing sites were in the western United States, allowing the service module to be jettisoned for a destructive reentry over the Pacific Ocean.

During reentry, Starliner experienced two technical problems unrelated to its earlier issues: a brief glitch in its navigation system and a consistent failure to ignite by one of the 12 thrusters used to orient the capsule during atmospheric re-entry. The thruster that failed was a monopropellant thruster built into the crew capsule proper and independent of the bipropellant thruster system in the service module that malfunctioned in orbit. The investigation determined that the orientation thruster likely failed due to corrosion caused by carbazic acid formed from residual propellant and carbon dioxide. The failure of this single thruster left the capsule without fault tolerance. The report noted that the crew module orientation system lacked the required two-fault tolerance for deorbit burns, a design limitation that had existed since early development but was not identified until the crewed flight test pre-launch.

An investigation report released in February 2026 retroactively classified the mission as a Type A mishap, NASA's most severe failure category, typically reserved for missions involving loss of vehicle or life. The report cited hardware failures, qualification deficiencies, leadership errors, and organizational shortcomings that created risks inconsistent with NASA's human spaceflight safety standards. Administrator Jared Isaacman said that while the spacecraft has design and engineering deficiencies requiring correction, he was most troubled by the failures in decision-making and leadership at both NASA and Boeing.

== See also ==
Media related to Boeing Crew Flight Test at Wikimedia Commons

- Development of the Commercial Crew Program
- SpaceX Dragon 2
- Crew Dragon Demo-2, SpaceX's first crewed mission of their capsule
