= Development of the Commercial Crew Program =

NASA space program partnership with space companies

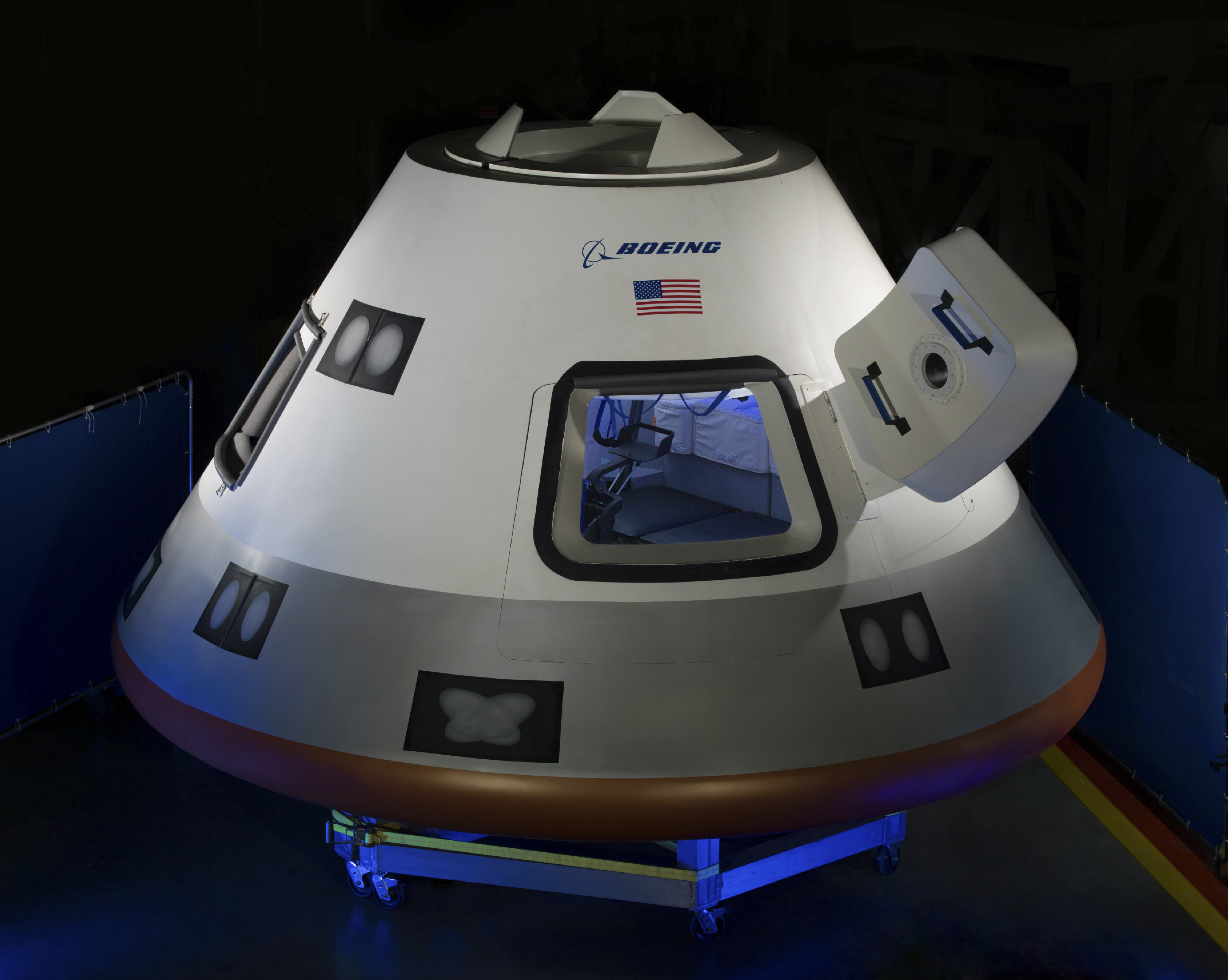
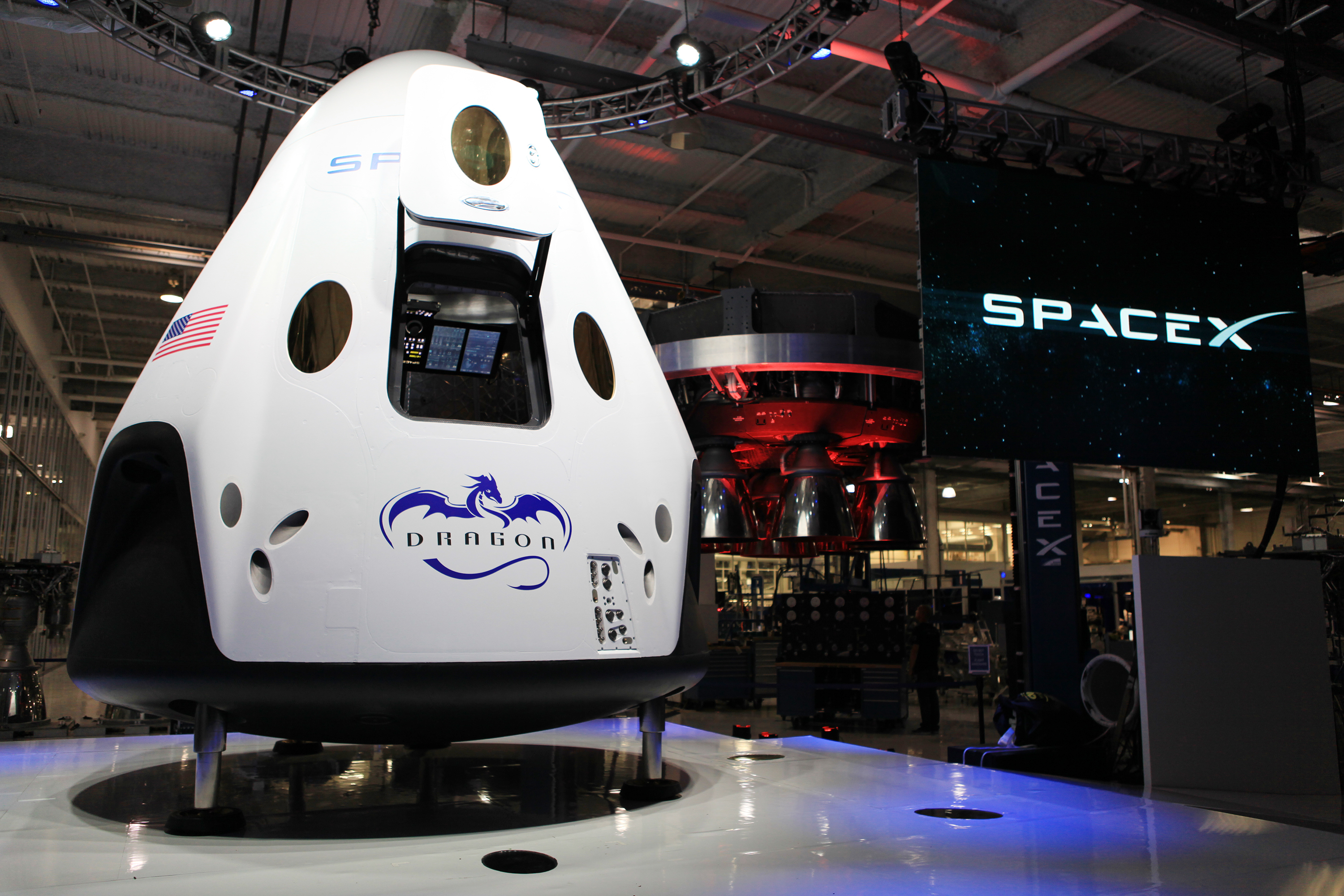
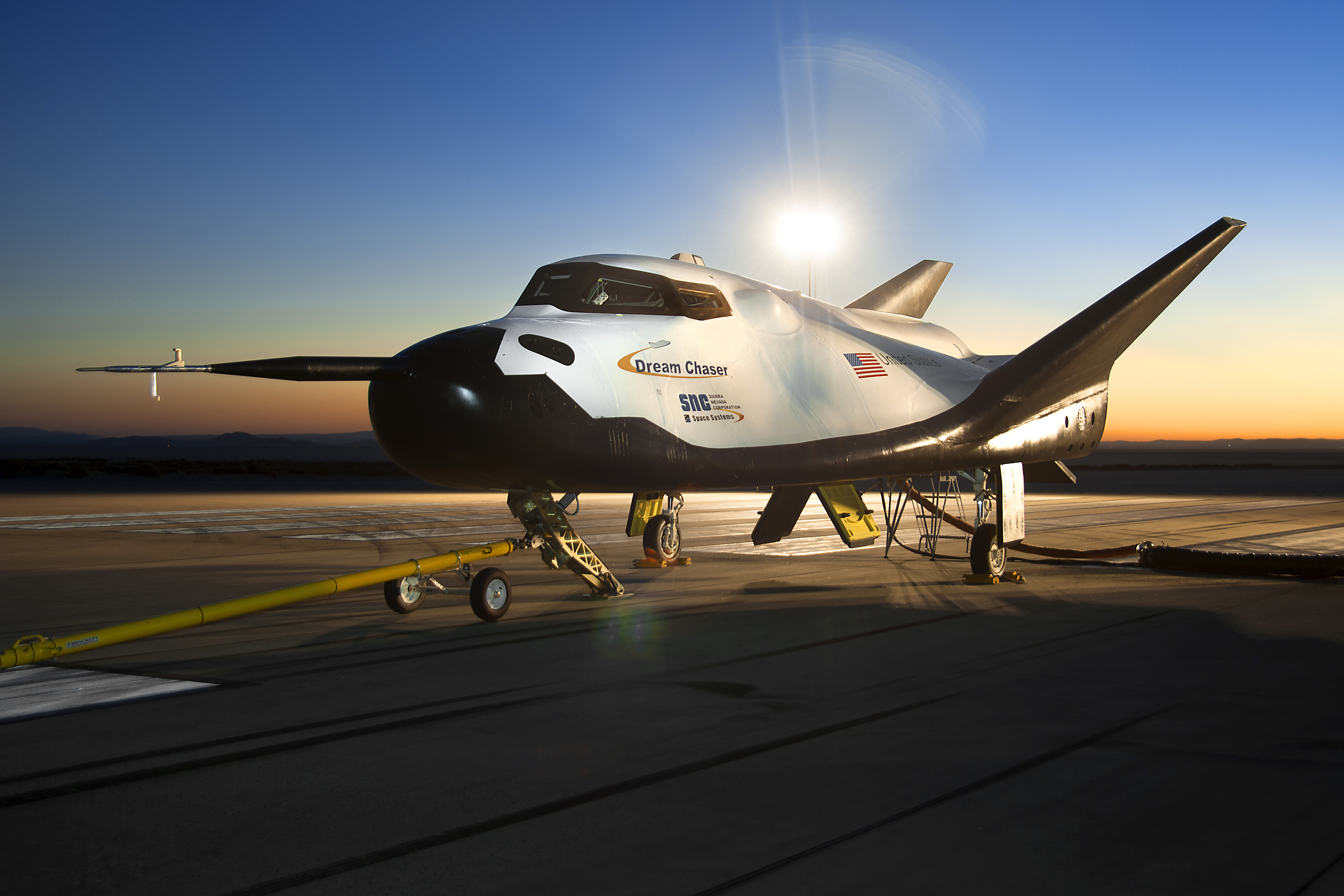
Starting from left: the Boeing CST-100 Starliner, Crew Dragon, and Dream Chaser projects all received developmental funding through CCDev awards and contracts

Development of the Commercial Crew Program (CCDev) began in the second round of the program, which was rescoped from a smaller technology development program for human spaceflight to a competitive development program that would produce the spacecraft to be used to provide crew transportation services to and from the International Space Station (ISS). To implement the program, NASA awarded a series of competitive fixed-price contracts to private vendors starting in 2011. Operational contracts to fly astronauts were awarded in September 2014 to SpaceX and Boeing, and NASA expected each company to complete development and achieve crew rating in 2017. Each company performed an uncrewed orbital test flight in 2019.

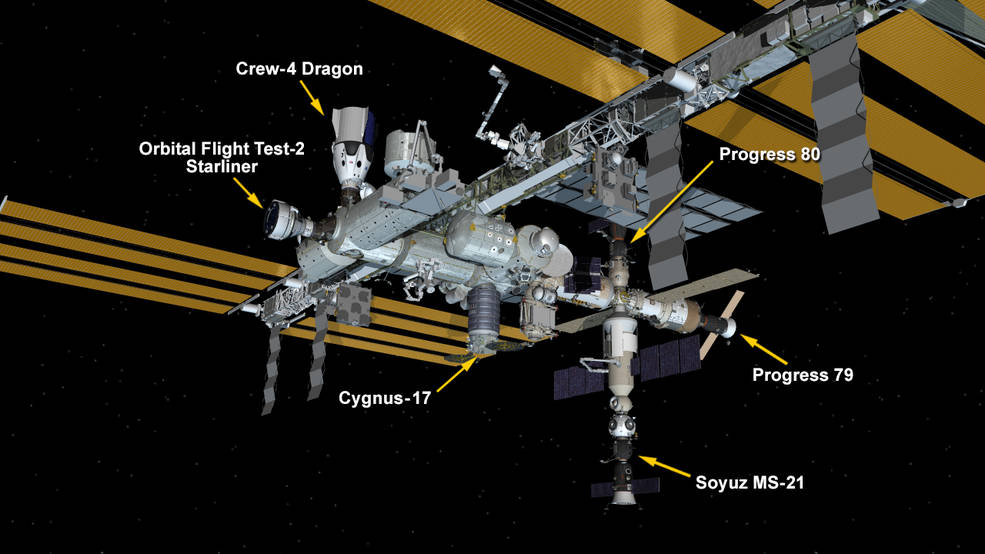
Both commercial Crew vehicles Crew Dragon and Starliner docked to ports on Harmony module at the same time

SpaceX's Crew Dragon Demo-1 2019 flight of Dragon 2 arrived at the International Space Station in March 2019 and returned via splashdown in the Atlantic Ocean. After completion of its test series, a Crew Dragon spacecraft made its first operational Commercial Crew Program flight, SpaceX Crew-1. The flight launched on November 16, 2020. As of September 2023 SpaceX has completed seven successful CCP flights with another, SpaceX Crew-8, currently in progress. It is contracted with NASA for fourteen operational flights total to the ISS.

The 2019 Boeing Orbital Flight Test of the CST-100 Starliner spacecraft failed to reach the ISS in December 2019. The second test flight, Boeing Orbital Flight Test 2, occurred successfully in May 2022. Pending completion of its demonstration flights, Boeing is contracted to supply six operational flights to the ISS. The first group of astronauts was announced on August 3, 2018. The first Starliner crewed flight test launched on June 5, 2024. Starliner successfully docked with the station on June 6, 2024, after suffering several helium leaks and thruster malfunctions. Due to these issues Starliner's return to earth was delayed initially to June 26, 2024, then indefinitely. On August 24, 2024 NASA administrator Bill Nelson made the decision to send the Starliner crew back home on SpaceX's Crew Dragon.

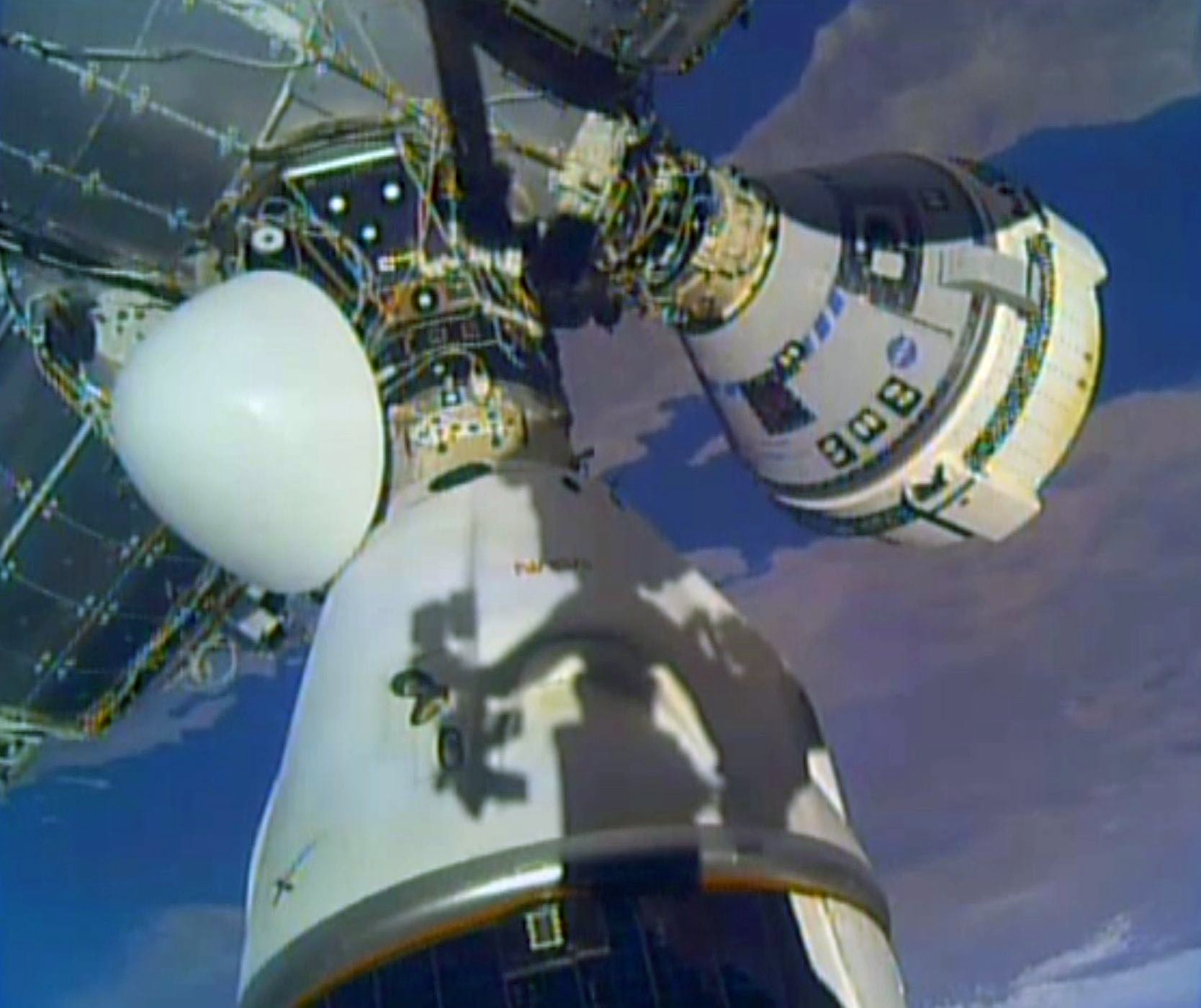
Commercial Crew Program vehicles Starliner and Dragon

== Requirements ==
Key high-level requirements for the Commercial Crew vehicles include:

- Safely deliver and return four crew members and their equipment to the International Space Station (ISS)
- Provide assured crew return in the event of an emergency
- Serve as a 24-hour safe haven in the event of an emergency
- Capable of remaining docked to the station for 210 days

== Background ==
After the retirement of STS in 2011 and the cancellation of the Constellation program, NASA had no domestic vehicles capable of launching astronauts to space. Artemis, NASA's next major human spaceflight initiative, was scheduled to launch an uncrewed qualification flight in 2016, with an Orion spacecraft atop a Space Launch System (SLS) booster. The NASA had no human-qualified spacecraft available, and in any event SLS/Orion would be too expensive for routine flights to the ISS. In the meantime, NASA continued to send astronauts to the ISS on Soyuz spacecraft seats purchased from Russia. The price varied over time, with the batch of seats from 2016 to 2017 costing $70.7 million per passenger per flight. Artemis continued to slip, with the first uncrewed test flight scheduled for 2022.

== Development Program ==
The CCDev program was initiated to develop safe and reliable commercial ISS crew launch capabilities to replace the Soyuz flights. CCDev followed Commercial Orbital Transportation Services (COTS), an ISS commercial cargo program. CCDev contracts were issued for fixed-price, pay-for-performance milestones. CCDev was implemented in several phases. CCDev 1 contracts were for development of concepts and technologies. CCDev 2 contracts were for actual vehicle designs. CCiCap contracts were for designs of complete end-to-end crew transportation hardware and services. CPC phase 1 contracts were for the development of a full certification plan. Finally CCtCap contracts were awarded for actual demonstration of crewed transportation services, which included development, testing, and production of the required hardware followed by operational flights to the ISS.

=== CCDev 1 ===
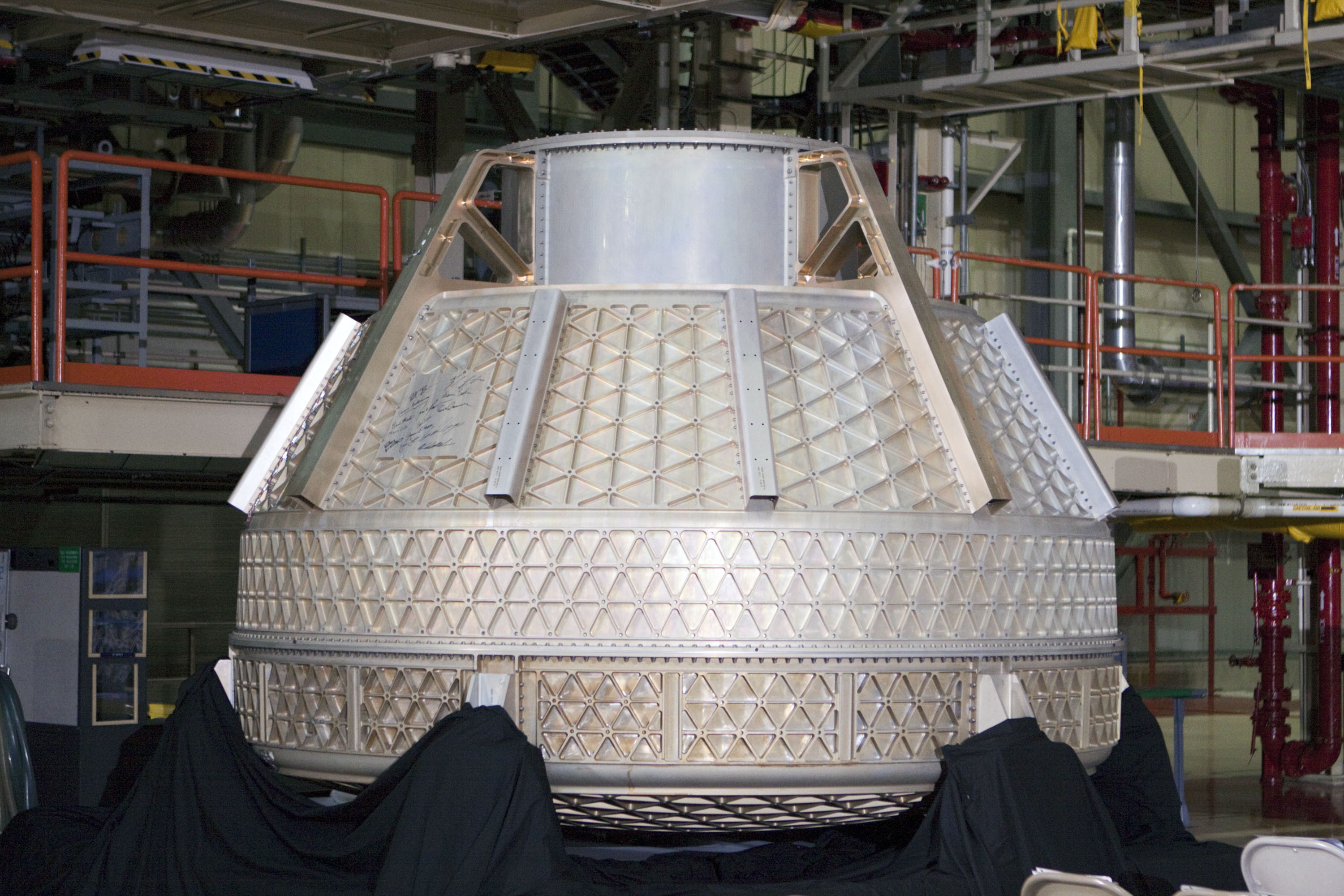
Construction of the Starliner pressure vessel was one of Boeing's CCDev 1 milestones

Commercial Crew Development phase 1 (CCDev 1) consisted of $50 million awarded in 2010 to five US companies to develop human spaceflight concepts and technologies. NASA awarded development funds to five companies under CCDev 1:

- Blue Origin: $3.7M for a 'pusher' Launch Abort System (LAS) and composite pressure vessels.
- Boeing: $18M for development of the CST-100 Starliner
- Paragon Space Development Corporation: $1.4M for a plug-and-play environmental control and life support system (ECLSS) Air Revitalization System (ARS) Engineering Development Unit.
- Sierra Nevada Corporation: $20M for development of the Dream Chaser
- United Launch Alliance: $6.7M for an Emergency Detection System (EDS) for human-rating Atlas V

=== CCDev 2 ===
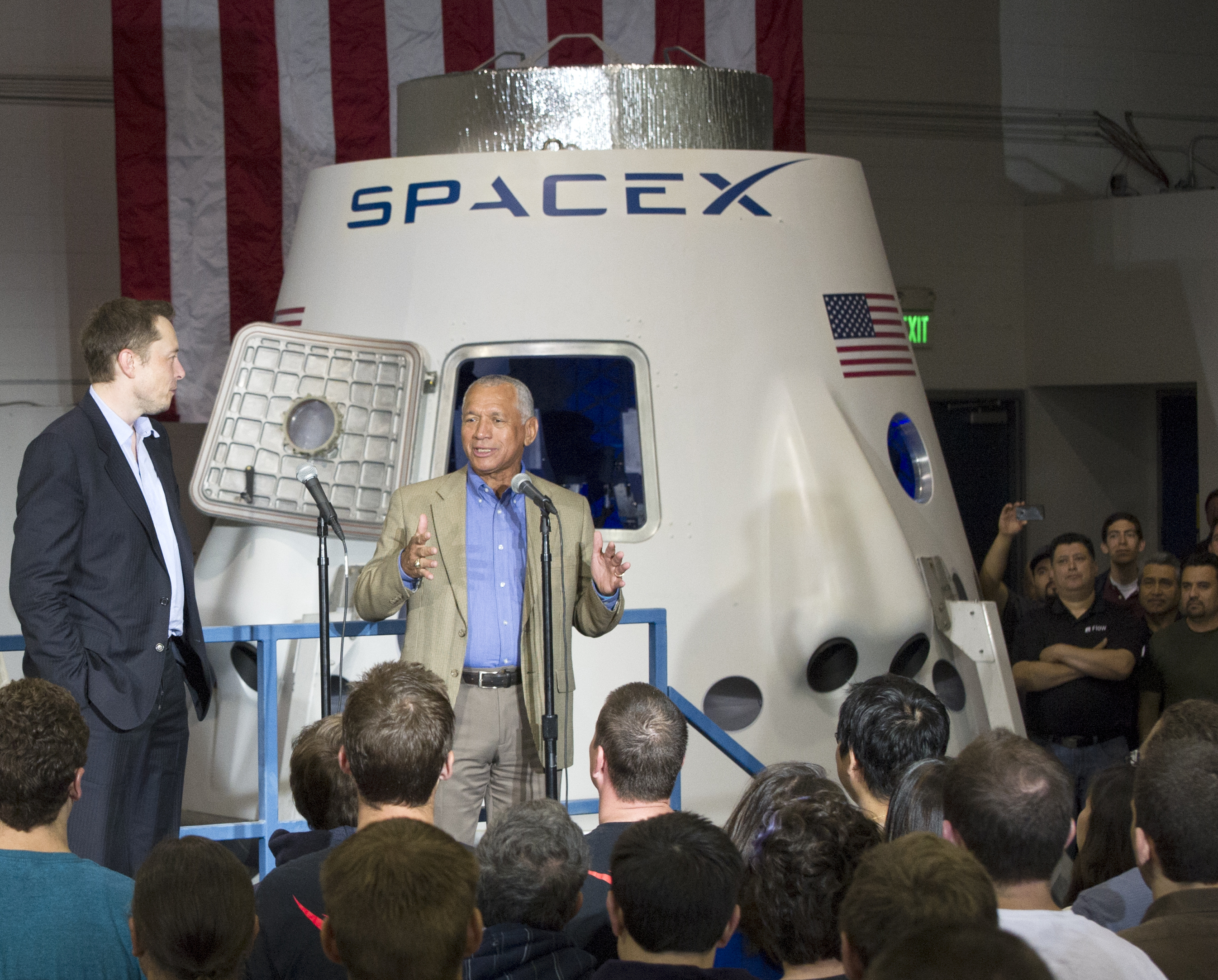
The construction of a Dragon crew mock-up was one of SpaceX's CCDev 2 milestones

On April 18, 2011, NASA awarded nearly $270 million to four companies for developing U.S. vehicles that could fly astronauts after the Space Shuttle fleet's retirement. Funded proposals:

- Blue Origin: $22 million. Technologies in support of a biconic nose cone design orbital vehicle, including launch abort system liquid oxygen/liquid hydrogen engines.
- Sierra Nevada Corporation: $80 million. Dream Chaser
- SpaceX: $75 million. Dragon 2 integrated launch abort system
- Boeing: $92.3 million. Additional CST-100 Starliner development

Proposals selected without NASA funding:

- United Launch Alliance: extend development work on human-rating the Atlas V
- Alliant Techsystems (ATK) and Astrium proposed development of Liberty. NASA was to share expertise and technology.
- Excalibur Almaz Inc. was developing a crewed system with modernized Soviet-era hardware intended for tourism flights to orbit. An unfunded Space Act Agreement to establish a framework to further develop EAI's spacecraft concept for low Earth orbit crew transportation.

Proposals not selected:

- Orbital Sciences proposed the Prometheus lifting-body spaceplane vehicle
- Paragon Space Development Corporation proposed additional development of the Commercial Crew Transport-Air Revitalization System.
- t/Space proposed a reusable eight-person crew or cargo transfer spacecraft
- United Space Alliance proposed to commercially fly the two remaining Space Shuttle vehicles.

=== CCiCap ===
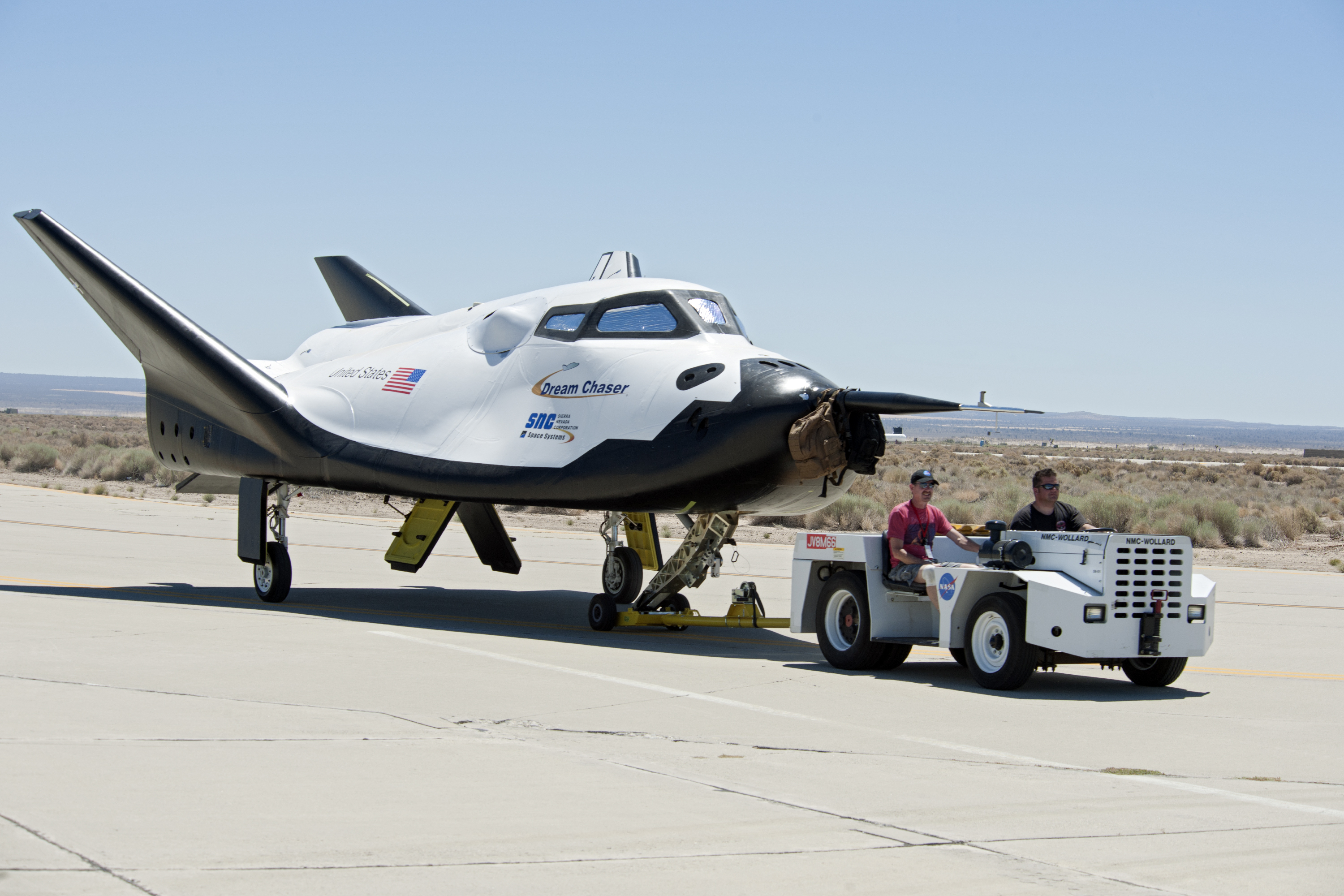
Flight testing of the Dream Chaser Engineering Test Article was one of Sierra Nevada's CCiCap milestones

Commercial Crew integrated Capability (CCiCap) was originally called CCDev 3. For this phase of the program, NASA wanted proposals to be complete, end-to-end concepts of operation, including spacecraft, launch vehicles, launch services, ground and mission operations, and recovery. In September 2011, NASA released a draft request for proposals (RFP). The final RFP was released on February 7, 2012, with proposals due on March 23, 2012. The funded Space Act Agreements were awarded on August 3, 2012, and amended on August 15, 2013.

The selected proposals were announced August 3, 2012:

- Sierra Nevada Corporation: $212.5 million. Dream Chaser/Atlas V
- SpaceX: $440 million. Dragon 2/Falcon 9
- Boeing: $460 million. CST-100 Starliner/Atlas V

=== CPC phase 1 ===
The first phase of the Certification Products Contract (CPC) involved the development of a certification plan with engineering standards, tests, and analyses. Winners of funding of phase 1 of the CPC, announced on December 10, 2012, were:

- Sierra Nevada Corporation: $10 million
- SpaceX: $9.6 million
- Boeing: $9.9 million

=== CCtCap – crew flights awarded ===
The Commercial Crew Transportation Capability (CCtCap) is the second phase of the CPC and included the final development, testing and verifications to allow crewed demonstration flights to the ISS. NASA issued the draft CCtCap contract's Request For Proposals (RFP) on July 19, 2013, with a response date of August 15, 2013. On September 16, 2014, NASA announced that Boeing and SpaceX had received contracts to provide crewed launch services to the ISS. Boeing could receive up to US$4.2 billion, while SpaceX could receive up to US$2.6 billion. Dragon was the less expensive proposal, but NASA's William H. Gerstenmaier considered the Boeing Starliner proposal the stronger of the two. In November 2019 NASA published a first cost per seat estimate: US$55 million for SpaceX's Dragon and US$90 million for Boeing's Starliner. Boeing was also granted an additional $287.2 million above the fixed price contract. Seats on Soyuz had an average cost of US$80 million. However, adjusting for the additional cargo carried by Boeing's Starliner inside its crew capsule, the adjusted cost per seat figure is approximately $70 million, which is still higher than SpaceX's Crew Dragon even if the Dragon does not carry the equivalent of a fifth passenger in cargo. Both the CST-100 Starliner and Crew Dragon were to fly an uncrewed flight, then a crewed certification flight, then up to six operational flights to the ISS.

== Timeline ==
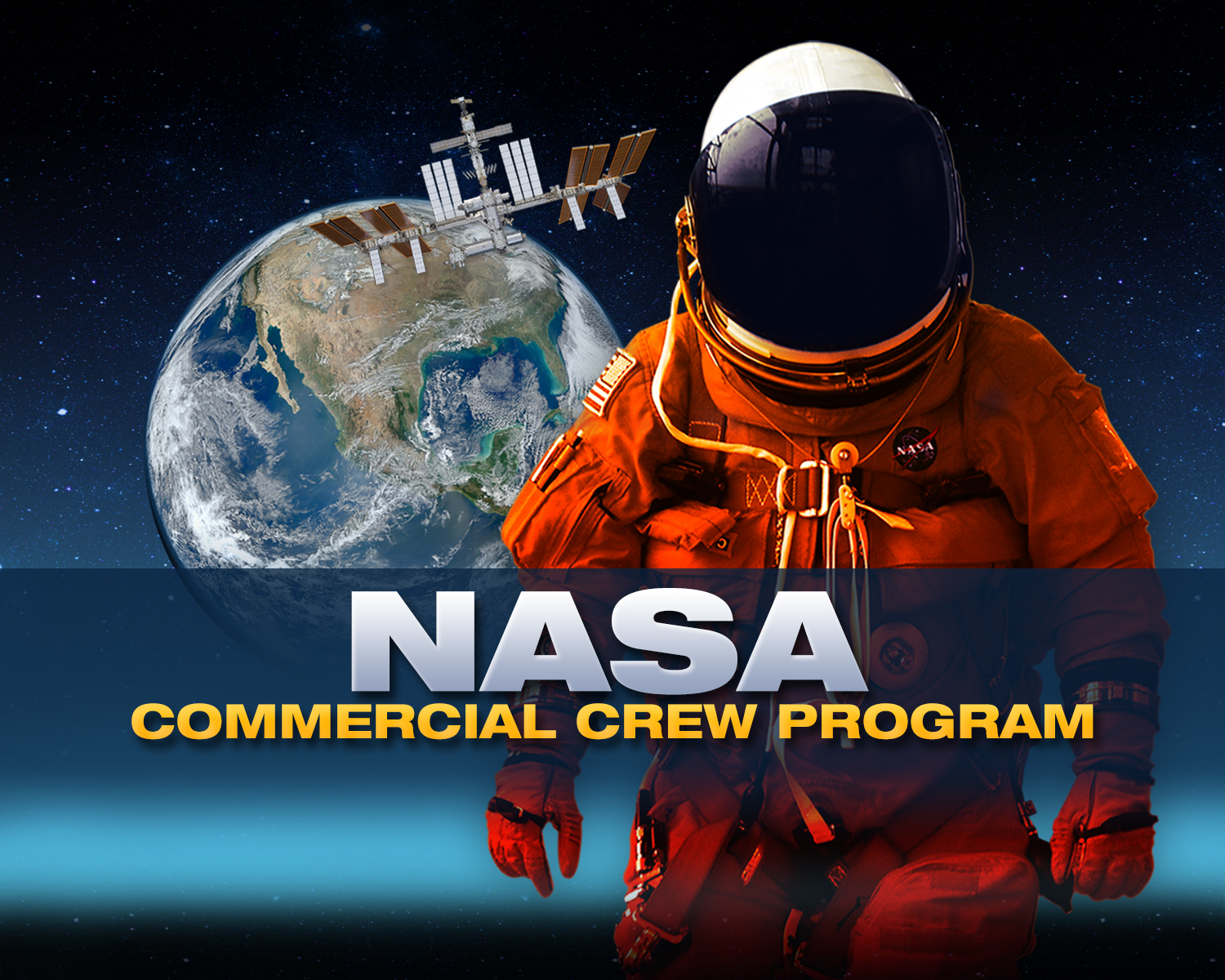
Commercial Crew Program

=== Ongoing delays ===
The first flight of the Commercial Crew Program was planned to occur in 2015, but insufficient funding caused delays. As the spacecraft entered the testing and production phase, technical issues also caused delays, especially the parachute system, propulsion, and the launch abort system of both capsules.

=== Starliner 2018 valve issue ===
In July 2018, a test anomaly was reported in which there was a hypergolic propellant leak due to several faulty abort system valves. Consequentially, the first unpiloted orbital mission was delayed to April 2019, and the first crew launch rescheduled to August 2019. In March 2019, Reuters reported these test flights had been delayed by at least three months, and in April 2019 Boeing announced that the unpiloted orbital mission was scheduled for August 2019.

=== Crew Dragon orbital flight test ===
The first orbital test of Crew Dragon was an uncrewed mission, commonly called "Demo-1" and launched on March 2, 2019. The spacecraft tested the approach and automated docking procedures with the ISS, remained docked until March 8, 2019, then conducted the full re-entry, splashdown and recovery steps to qualify for a crewed mission. Life-support systems were monitored for the entirety the test flight.

=== Crew Dragon explosion ===
On April 20, 2019, an issue arose during a static fire test of Crew Dragon. The accident destroyed the capsule which was planned to be used for the In-Flight Abort Test (IFAT). SpaceX confirmed that the capsule exploded. NASA stated that the explosion would delay the planned in-flight abort and crewed orbital tests.

=== Starliner Orbital Flight Test failure ===
During the first orbital flight test of Starliner in December 2019, the spacecraft reached orbit but was unable to dock with ISS due to a critical software error. Subsequent analysis revealed a second critical software error that could cause the service module to collide with the capsule after separation during the de-orbiting sequence.

=== Crew Dragon crewed flight ===
On May 30, 2020, two astronauts were launched to the ISS with a Crew Dragon as part of Crew Dragon Demo-2. The end and safe landing of Demo-2 on August 2, 2020, marked the first splashdown in 45 years for NASA astronauts since the first Apollo–Soyuz U.S./U.S.S.R international space mission in July 1975, as well as the first splashdown of a crew spacecraft in the Gulf of Mexico.

=== Starliner 2021 valve issue ===
Shortly before the scheduled launch of the second orbital flight test in August 2021, routine pre-launch testing showed that thirteen valves in the propulsion system were inoperable and the launch was scrubbed. The problem required extensive analysis that was still ongoing in October 2021, and NASA and Boeing estimated that a new launch date would be scheduled in the first half of 2022.

=== Starliner Orbital Flight Test 2 ===
Boeing Starliner Spacecraft 2 launched as part of the Boeing Orbital Flight Test 2, on May 19, 2022. It successfully docked on May 21, where it stayed for four days. On May 25, the spacecraft undocked and landed successfully in the White Sands Missile Range.

=== Starliner Crewed Flight Test ===
Days before a planned launch, Boeing announced in June 2023 that it would delay the Crewed Flight Test indefinitely due to issues with the parachute system and wiring harnesses. The mission entails flying a crew of two NASA astronauts to the International Space Station for a one-week test flight. The Crewed Flight Test successfully launched on June 5, 2024. The Starliner spacecraft docked to the International Space Station the next day after troubleshooting issues with the thrusters on the vehicle. After more thruster testing, both in space and using another Starliner vehicle on Earth, NASA announced on August 24, 2024, that the two astronauts on the mission, Butch Wilmore and Suni Williams, would not return to Earth on Starliner, but instead fly back on Crew Dragon with the SpaceX Crew-9 mission. The Starliner spacecraft successfully landed on the September 7, 2024. NASA confirmed on October 15, 2024, that Starliner would not be used for the following two crew rotation missions. In October 2024, Boeing started exploring part of its space business.

== Funding ==
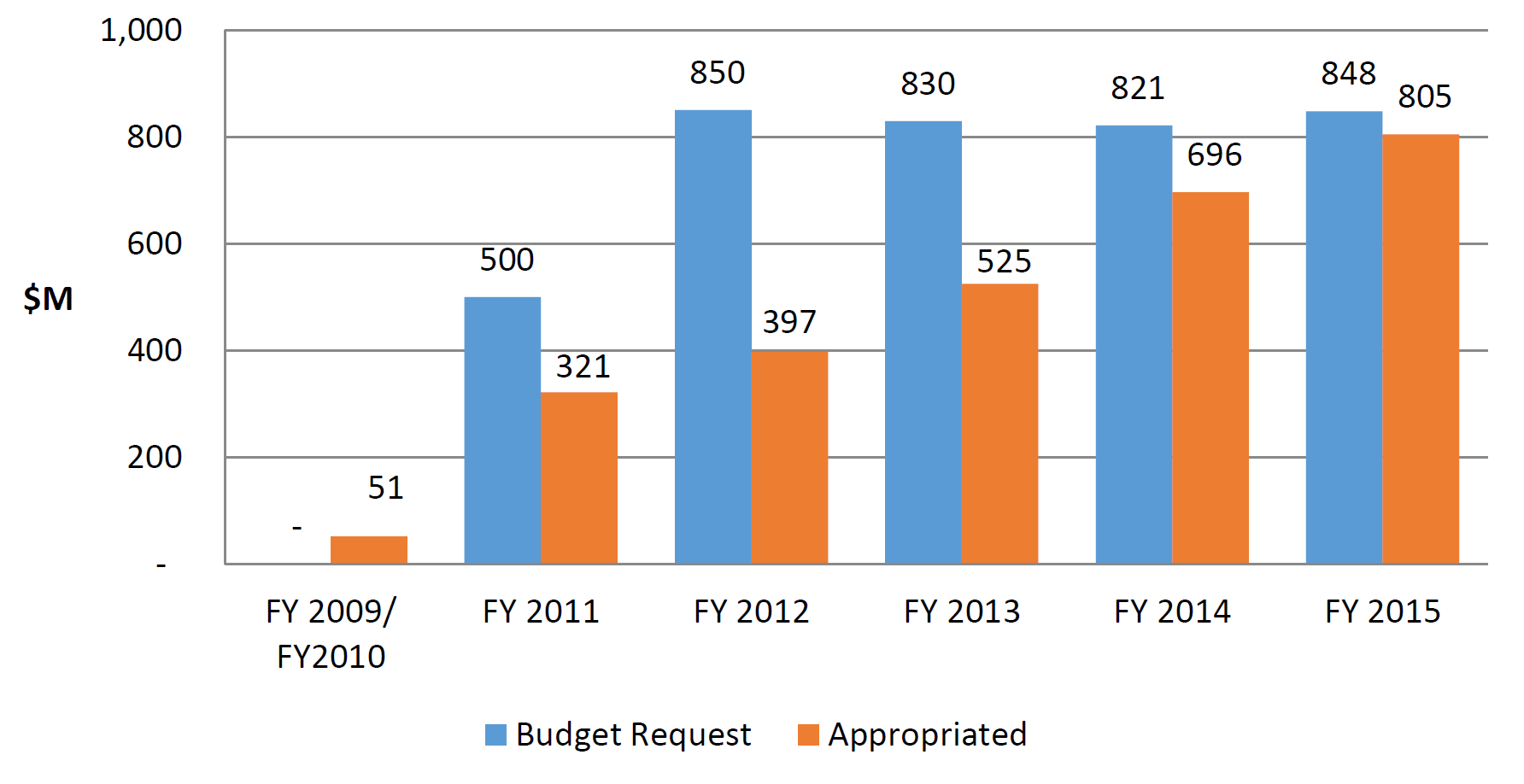
Requested vs appropriated funding by year up to 2015

The first flight of the Commercial Crew Program was planned to occur in 2015, but insufficient funding caused delays. For the fiscal year (FY) 2011 budget, US$500 million was requested for the CCDev program, but Congress granted only $270 million. For the FY 2012 budget, $850 million was requested and $406 million approved. For the FY 2013 budget, 830 million was requested and $488 million approved. For the FY 2014 budget, $821 million was requested and $696 million approved. In FY 2015, $848 million was requested and $805 million, or 95%, was approved. On November 14, 2019, NASA's inspector general published an auditing report listing per-seat prices of $90 million for Starliner and $55 million for Dragon Crew. With these, Boeing's price is higher than what NASA has paid the Russian space corporation, Roscosmos, for Soyuz spacecraft seats to fly US and partner-nation astronauts to the space station. The report also states that NASA agreed to pay an additional $287.2 million above Boeing's fixed prices to mitigate a perceived 18-month gap in ISS flights anticipated in 2019 and to ensure the contractor continued as a second commercial crew provider, without offering similar opportunities to SpaceX. On November 18, 2019, Boeing's Jim Chilton replied that the inspector general's report failed to list Starliner's positive features and objected to the per seat pricing as they believe the cost is lower than $90 million given its cargo capacity. Boeing's reasoning for the extra funding was due to a later start to its development than SpaceX with comparable deadlines. Boeing also stated it committed to the program. The funding of all commercial crew contractors for each phase of the CCP program is as follows—CCtCap values are maxima and include six post-development operational flights for each vendor.

Funding summary (in millions of US$)
| Round (year) | CCDev1 (2010) | CCDev2 (2011) | CCiCap (2012) | CPC1 (2013) | CCtCap (2014) | Add. Fund. (2017) | Total |
|---|---|---|---|---|---|---|---|
| Boeing | 18.0 | 112.9 | 480.0 | 9.9 | 4,200.0 | 287.2 | 5,108.0 |
| SpaceX | — | 75.0 | 460.0 | 9.6 | 2,600.0 | — | 3,144.6 |
| Sierra Nevada Corporation | 20.0 | 105.6 | 227.5 | 10.0 | — | — | 363.1 |
| Blue Origin | 3.7 | 22.0 | — | — | — | — | 25.7 |
| United Launch Alliance | 6.7 | — | — | — | — | — | 6.7 |
| Paragon Space Development Corporation | 1.4 | — | — | — | — | — | 1.4 |
| Total | 49.8 | 315.5 | 1,167.5 | 29.5 | 6,800.0 | 287.2 | 8,648.5 |

== Test Missions ==
Each system is required to successfully complete abort testing, an uncrewed orbital flight test, and a crewed orbital flight test to meet NASA's requirements for human-rating certification. The agency did allow the companies to propose how they would complete the required tests, with Boeing opting not to perform an in-flight abort test, which NASA approved.

Crew Dragon completed its flight tests in mid-2020 and began operational flights in November 2020. NASA will decide after September 2024 if Boeing has met its certification requirements after the problems experienced on its crew flight test.

| Mission | Spacecraft | Description | Crew | Date | Outcome |
|---|---|---|---|---|---|
| Crew Dragon Pad Abort Test | Crew Dragon DragonFly | Pad abort test, Cape Canaveral Air Force Station, Florida | —N/a | 2015-05-06 | Success |
| Crew Dragon Demo-1 | Crew Dragon C204 | Uncrewed test flight. Demo-1 launched on March 2, 2019, and docked to ISS PMA-2/IDA-2 docking port a little under 24 hours after launch. The Dragon spent five days docked to ISS before undocking and landing on March 8, 2019. | —N/a | 2019-03-02 | Success |
| Boeing Pad Abort Test | Boeing Starliner Spacecraft 1 | Uncrewed Pad Abort Test | —N/a | 2019-11-04 | Success |
| Boeing Orbital Flight Test | Boeing Starliner Calypso | Uncrewed test flight. Was the first flight of an Atlas V with a dual engine Centaur upper stage. Was originally planned to spend eight days docked to ISS before landing. However, Starliner was unable to rendezvous with the station due to the MET anomaly forcing it to enter a lower-than-expected orbit. The spacecraft returned on December 22, 2019, after spending two days in orbit. OFT-2 was proposed to meet all objectives. | —N/a | 2019-12-20 | Partial failure due to MET anomaly |
| Crew Dragon In-Flight Abort Test | Crew Dragon C205 | A Falcon 9 booster launched a Dragon 2 capsule from LC-39A to perform an in-flight abort shortly after Max q in order to test Dragon 2's launch abort system. Abort occurred at 84 seconds after launch and Dragon 2 successfully separated from the Falcon 9 and flew away using its SuperDraco thrusters. The Falcon 9 booster disintegrated as a result of aerodynamic forces. Dragon 2 splashed down nine minutes after launch after successfully deploying its four parachutes. | —N/a | 2020-01-19 | Success |
| Crew Dragon Demo-2 | Crew Dragon Endeavour | Crewed test flight. Dragon 2 launched with two crew members and docked to the ISS about 18 hours later. Dragon and its crew spent 62 days on board the ISS. | Doug Hurley; Bob Behnken | 2020-05-30 | Success |
| Boeing Orbital Flight Test 2 | Boeing Starliner Spacecraft 2 | Uncrewed test flight. Suggested by Boeing and approved by NASA on April 6, 2020, due to the partial failure of Boe-OFT. A Boe-OFT 2 flight attempt was scrubbed before launch on August 3, 2021. It was rescheduled and took place on May 19, 2022. | —N/a | 2022-05-19 | Partial failure (Note: Retroactively classified in February 2026 as a partial failure.) |
| Boeing Crew Flight Test | Boeing Starliner Calypso | Crewed test flight. Was to launch two astronauts, dock at the ISS, and return eight days later. Experienced thruster malfunctions during docking. After months of testing, NASA decided that it was too risky to return astronauts to Earth aboard Starliner, which returned uncrewed. | Barry E. Wilmore; Sunita Williams | 2024-06-05 | Failure (Note: Retroactively classified in February 2026 as a Type A mishap, the most serious failure category, typically reserved for missions involving loss of vehicle or life.) |

== Operational missions ==
Crew Dragon began flying operational missions in November 2020 and had flown eleven missions as of January 2026.

As of January 2026, Starliner is not yet certified and has not flown any operational missions.

== See also ==
- Commercial Orbital Transportation Services
- Commercial Resupply Services
- NASA Docking System
- Private spaceflight
- Review of United States Human Space Flight Plans Committee
- Space Shuttle successors
