= Crew Dragon Pad Abort Test =

2015 SpaceX spacecraft test

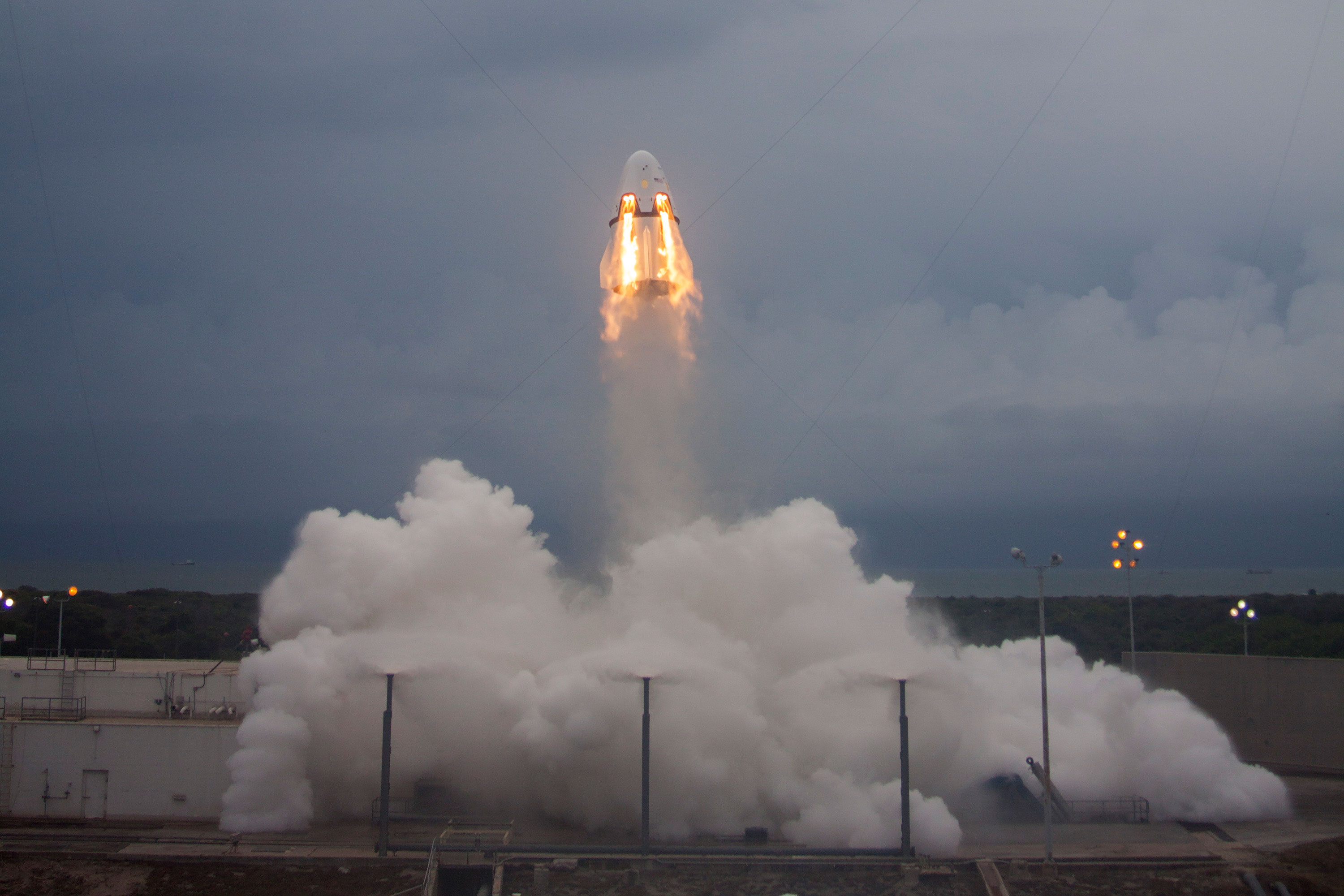
- DragonFly launches at the start of the flight
- Names: SpaceX Pad Abort Test
- Mission type: Technology demonstration
- Operator: SpaceX
- Mission duration: 1 minute, 39 seconds

Spacecraft properties
- Spacecraft: Crew Dragon DragonFly
- Spacecraft type: Crew Dragon
- Manufacturer: SpaceX

Start of mission
- Launch date: 6 May 2015, 13:00 UTC (9:00 am EDT)
- Launch site: Cape Canaveral, SLC‑40

End of mission
- Landing date: 6 May 2015, 13:01:39 UTC (9:01:39 am EDT)
- Landing site: Atlantic Ocean
- Mission patch Commercial Crew Development Crew Dragon flights

The Crew Dragon Pad Abort Test (officially known as the SpaceX Pad Abort Test) was a spacecraft test conducted by SpaceX on 6 May 2015 from the Space Launch Complex 40 (SLC-40) at Cape Canaveral Air Force Station, Florida. As part of the development of NASA's Commercial Crew Program, the test demonstrated the spacecraft's abort system capability, verifying the capsule's eight side-mounted SuperDraco thrusters' capability to quickly power itself away from a failing rocket while it is still on the ground. It was one of the two tests conducted by SpaceX on the abort system of spacecraft, the other one being the Crew Dragon In-Flight Abort Test conducted on 19 January 2020.

== History ==
The flight was the one of four tests for the Commercial Crew Program (CCiCap) award given to SpaceX in 2012. The capsule had 270 sensors as well as a dummy and had weights to simulate a crewed launch.

The vehicle lifted off at 13:00 UTC on 6 May 2015. After reaching a maximum height of about 1,187 m (3,894 ft), slightly lower than expected; Dragon jettisoned its trunk about 21 seconds after the liftoff. The Dragon then deployed both the drogue and three main parachutes as expected. The vehicle splashed down safely in the ocean to the east of the launchpad in the Atlantic Ocean 99 seconds after the liftoff about 8 seconds earlier then planned. The landing site was expected to be about 2.3 km (1.4 mi) away from the launchpad but landed closer to shore then expected. The slight underperformances were linked to a fuel mixture ratio issue was detected after the flight in one of the eight SuperDraco engines, but did not materially affect the flight.

The C201 capsule, dubbed DragonFly was originally planned to be used for the in-flight abort test expected to fly after this mission. However, SpaceX and NASA decided later to use the capsule used for Demo-1 for the in-flight abort test as there were design changes after construction of DragonFly. However, as that capsule was destroyed SpaceX used the one planned to be used for Demo-2.

== Gallery ==
Pad Abort Test
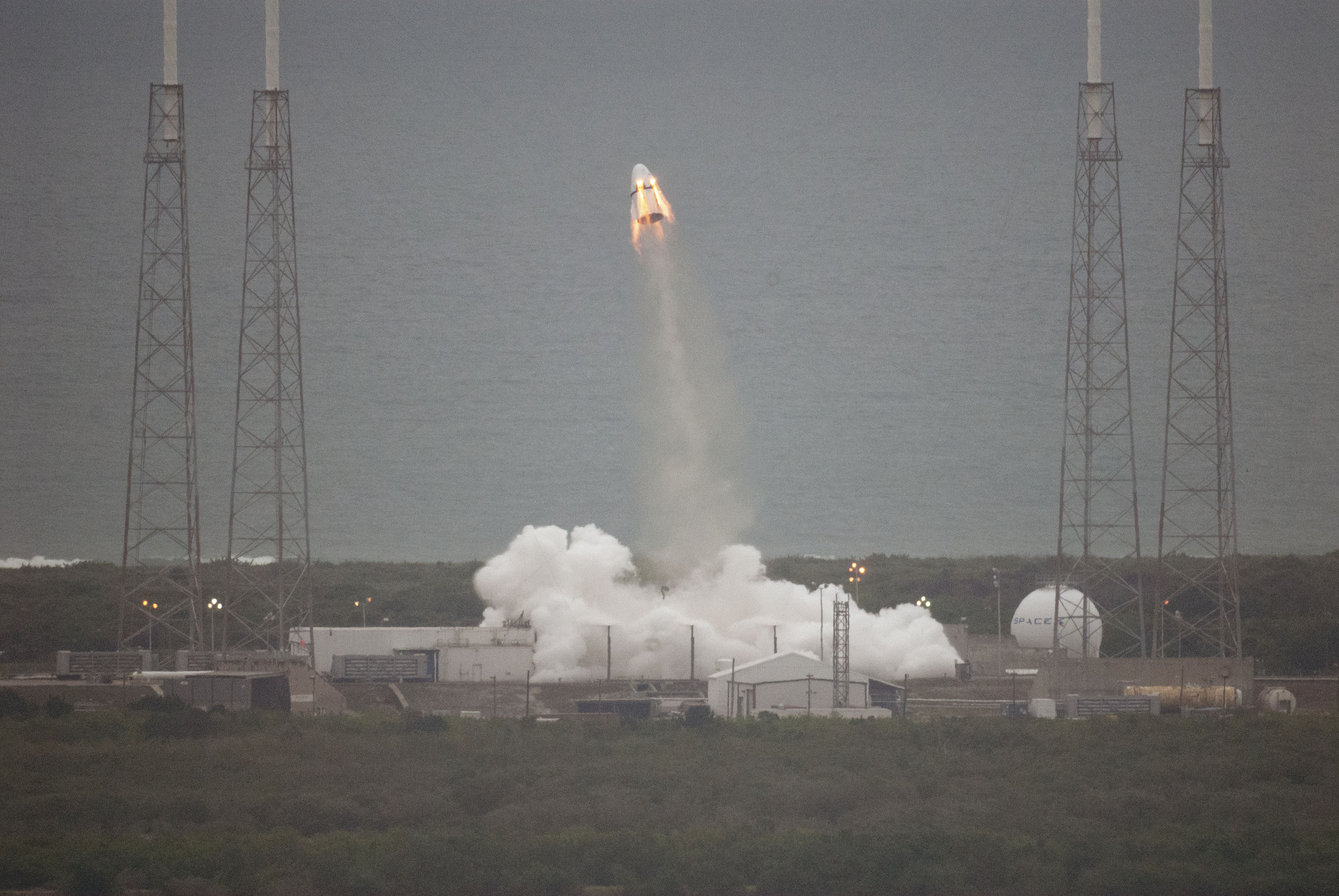
Liftoff

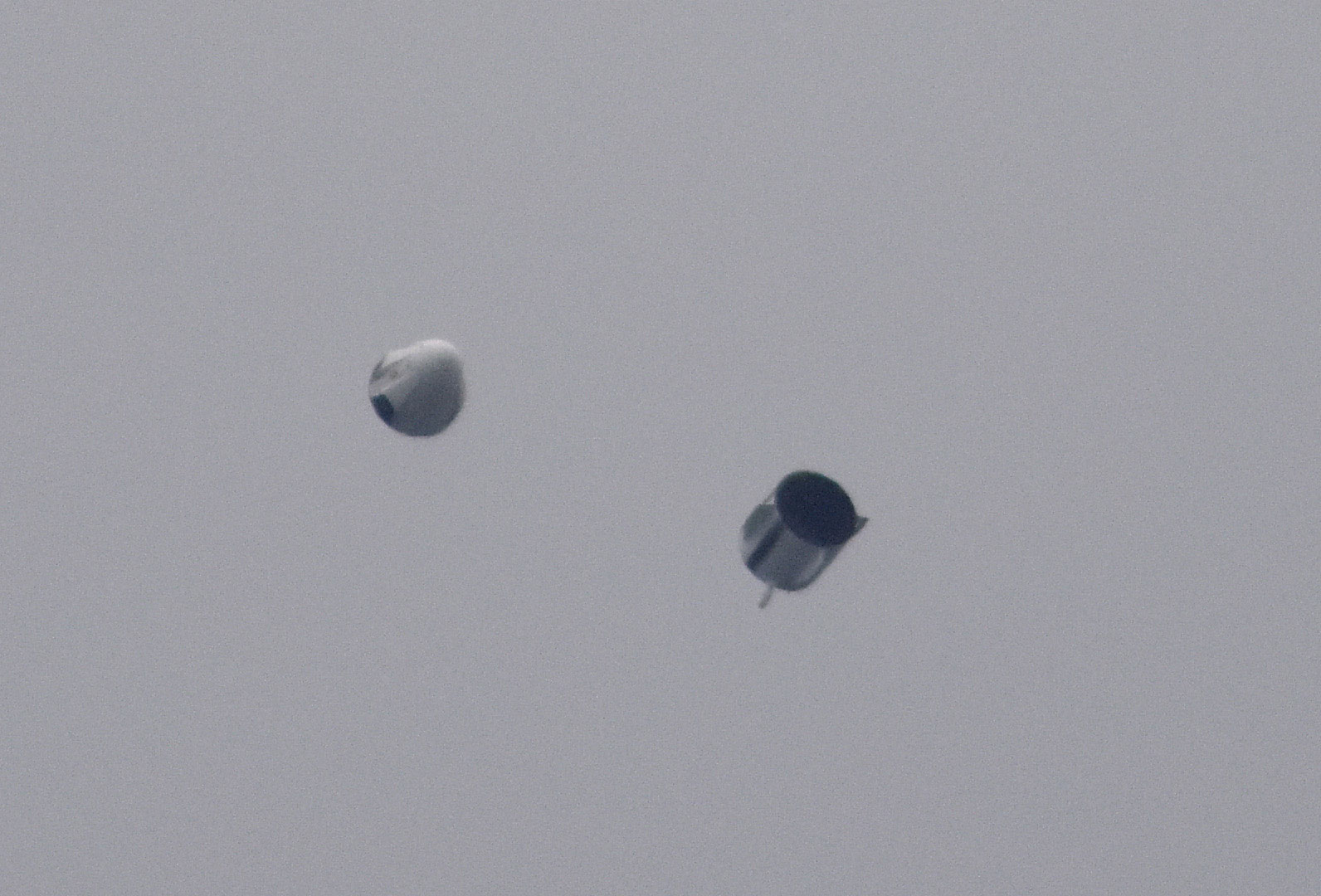
Trunk separation

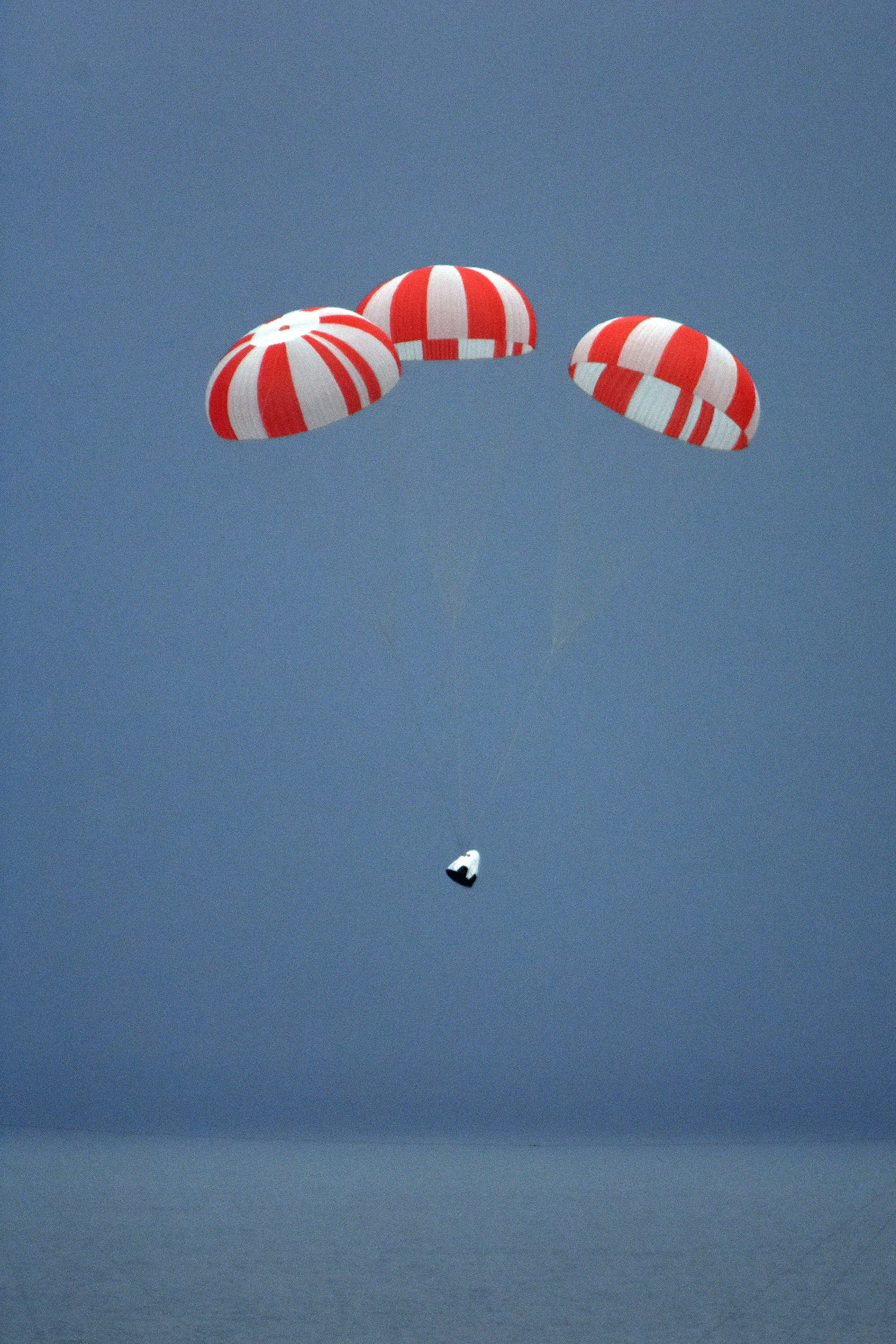
Descent

== See also ==
- Boeing Pad Abort Test
- Crew Dragon In-Flight Abort Test
- SpaceX Dragon 2
