= Boeing Orbital Flight Test =

Uncrewed flight test of the Boeing Starliner spacecraft

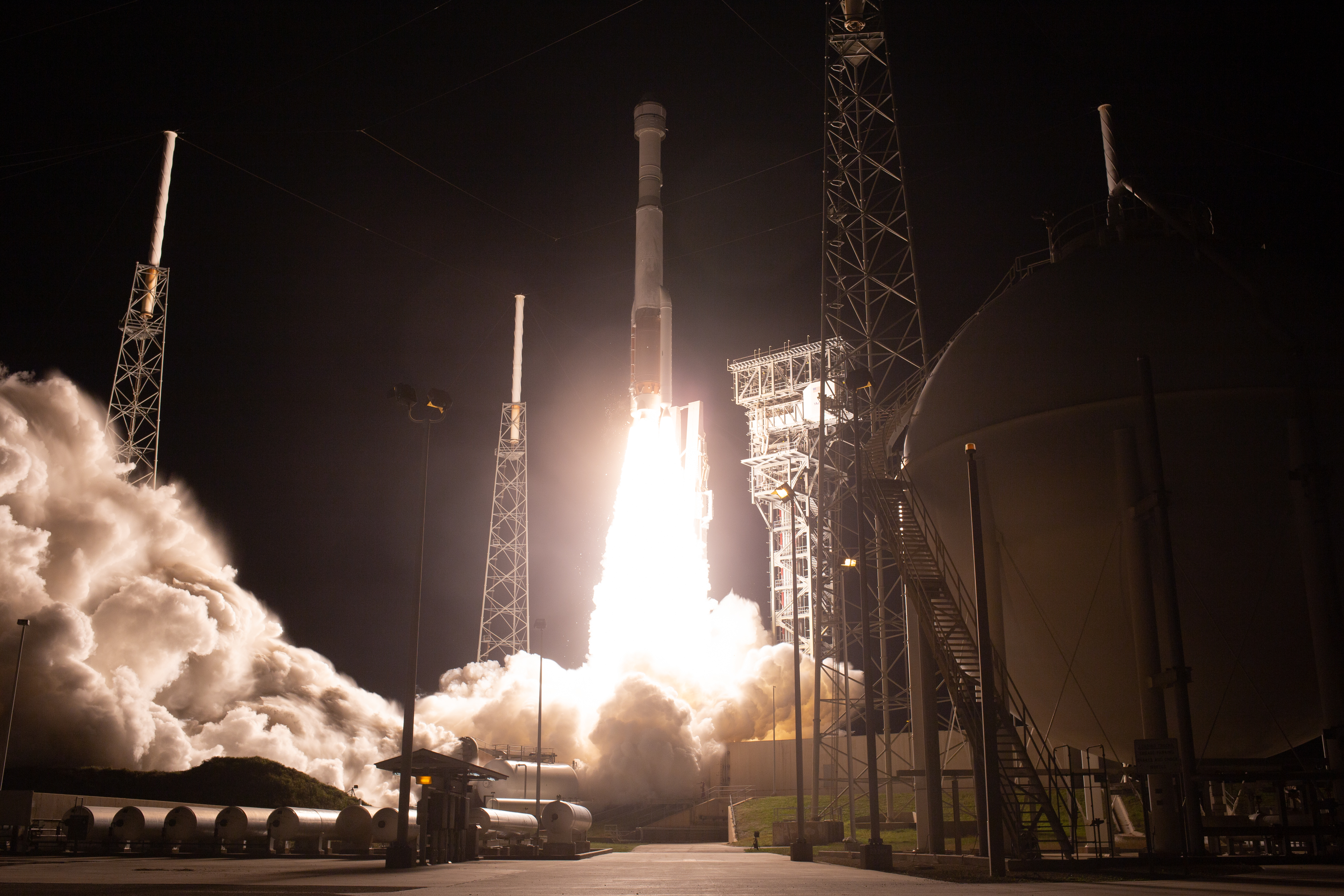
- The maiden Atlas V N22 launch
- Names: Boe-OFT
- Mission type: Flight test
- Operator: Boeing Defense, Space & Security
- COSPAR ID: 2019-094A
- SATCAT no.: 44900
- Mission duration: 8 days (planned); 2 days, 1 hour, 22 minutes (achieved)

Spacecraft properties
- Spacecraft: Boeing Starliner Calypso
- Spacecraft type: Boeing Starliner
- Manufacturer: Boeing Defense, Space & Security
- Launch mass: 13,000 kg (29,000 lb)

Start of mission
- Launch date: 20 December 2019, 11:36:43 UTC (6:36:43 am EST)
- Rocket: Atlas V N22 (Note: N22 designates that the Atlas V has no payload fairing, two solid rocker boosters, and two Centaur second-stage engines.); AV-080
- Launch site: Cape Canaveral, SLC-41
- Contractor: United Launch Alliance

End of mission
- Landing date: 22 December 2019, 12:58:53 UTC
- Landing site: White Sands Space Harbor

Orbital parameters
- Reference system: Geocentric orbit
- Regime: Low Earth orbit
- Perigee altitude: 187 km (116 mi)
- Apogee altitude: 222 km (138 mi)
- Inclination: 51.63°
- Period: 90.00 minutes
- Boeing Starliner Orbital Flight Test mission patch Commercial Crew Development Boeing Starliner flights

The Boeing Starliner Orbital Flight Test (also known as Boe-OFT) was the first orbital mission of the CST-100 Starliner spacecraft, conducted by Boeing as part of NASA's Commercial Crew Program. The mission was planned to be an eight-day test flight of the spacecraft, involving a rendezvous and docking with the International Space Station (ISS), and a landing in the western United States. The mission was launched on December 20, 2019, at 11:36:43 UTC or 06:36:43 AM EST; however an issue with the spacecraft's Mission Elapsed Time (MET) clock occurred 31 minutes into flight. This anomaly caused the spacecraft to burn into an incorrect orbit, preventing a rendezvous with the International Space Station (ISS). The mission was reduced to just two days, with the spacecraft successfully landing at White Sands Space Harbor on December 22, 2019.

On 6 April 2020, Boeing announced that it would conduct another Orbital Flight Test to prove and meet all of the test objectives. NASA accepted the proposal from Boeing to do another uncrewed test flight, Boeing Orbital Flight Test 2 (Boe-OFT-2).

== Payload ==
Instead of carrying astronauts, the flight carried an Anthropomorphic Test Device (ATD) wearing Boeing's custom flight suit. The ATD is named Rosie (aka "Rosie the Rocketeer"), as a homage to all the women who helped contribute to the Starliner Program. The capsule was weighted similarly to missions with astronauts onboard and carried approximately 270 kg (600 lb) of supplies and equipment including a plush toy of Snoopy and holiday presents for the Expedition 61 crew members. Due to the inability to dock with the ISS, this cargo was never delivered.

== Mission ==
The first Atlas V N22, designated AV-080, launched the CST-100 Starliner spacecraft on an uncrewed test flight to the International Space Station. The capsule was intended to dock with the space station, then return to Earth to land in the Western United States after an orbital shakedown cruise ahead of Boeing Crewed Flight Test.

OFT is the first flight of an Atlas V without a payload fairing and its first flight with a dual-engine Centaur upper stage. The dual-engine Centaur uses two RL-10 and is required for Starliner flights in order to provide a launch trajectory that allows for a safe abort at any point in the mission.

The mission launched successfully on December 20, 2019, at 11:36:43 UTC, but thirty-one minutes after launch the mission elapsed timer (MET) clock made an error. During a later press conference, it was revealed that MET was offset by 11 hours. When it became obvious that the maneuver did not happen, NASA and Boeing tried sending commands to get Starliner back on track, but the position of the spacecraft switching communications between two TDRS satellites delayed the orbital insertion burn. This delay resulted in an abnormal orbit and excessive fuel use. The decision was made to scratch the ISS rendezvous/docking since the spacecraft burned too much fuel to reach orbit even after Mission control center fixed the MET clock issue. NASA and Boeing officials placed the spacecraft in a different orbit and the entire flight plan had to be redone and the mission was reduced from eight days to three flight days.

By 11:40 UTC, the Starliner was in a "stable orbit", though orbital insertion was not nominal. It was later confirmed that Starliner had placed itself into a 187 km × 222 km (116 mi × 138 mi) orbit.

By 13:55 UTC, mission control center had realized that docking with the ISS was precluded. Despite not being able to dock and the MET anomaly, Jim Bridenstine stated during a press conference that "A lot of things went right. And this is in fact why we test".

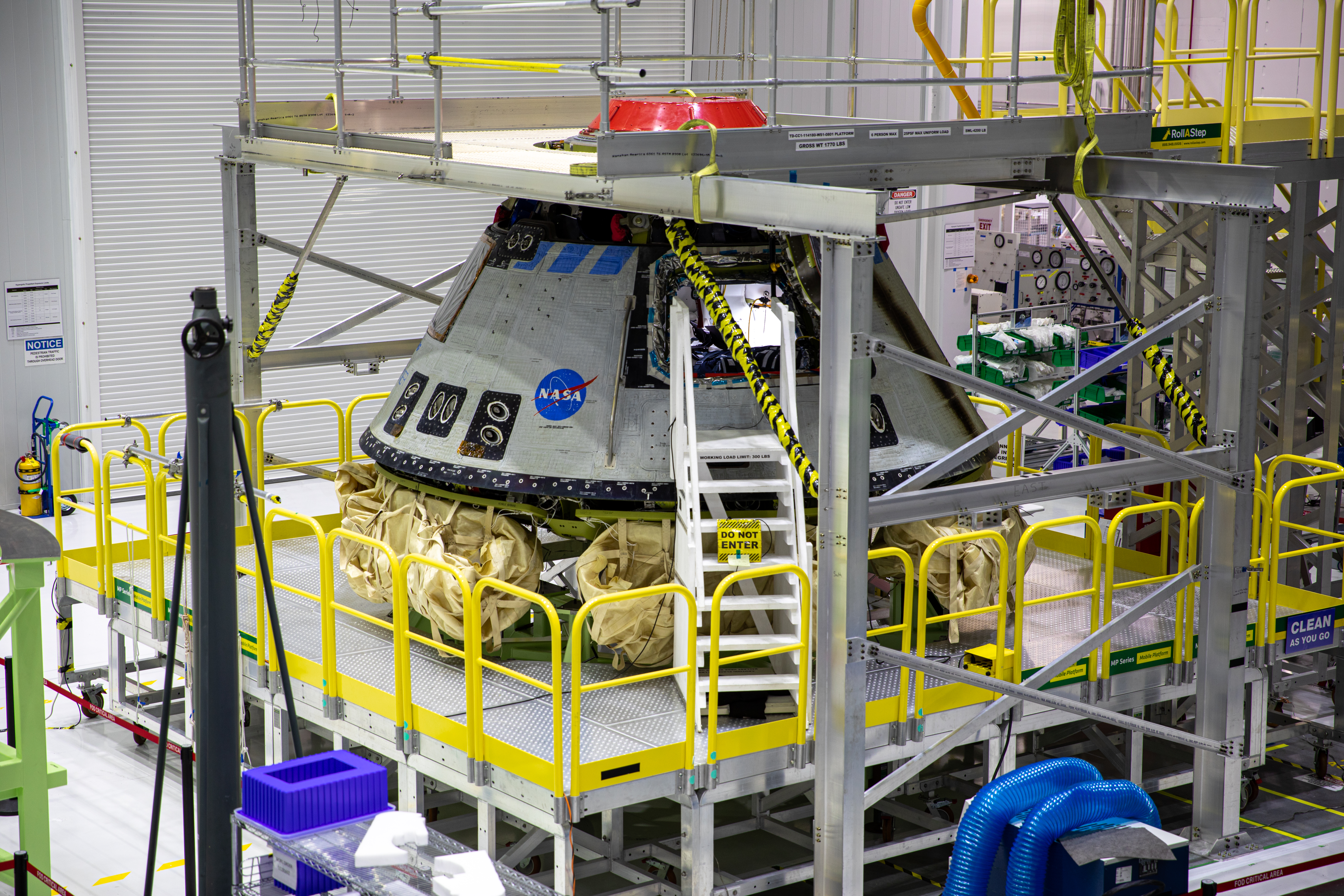
Calypso in processing after returning to Earth.

On December 22, 2019, Starliner was cleared to reenter the Earth's atmosphere. After deorbiting, Starliner reentered the Earth's atmosphere, before successfully deploying all sets of parachutes. Starliner deployed airbags and successfully touched-down at White Sands Space Harbor at 12:58:53 UTC. Though the ISS rendezvous that was planned for the OFT did not happen, Jim Chilton, vice president for Boeing's space and launch division, estimated that Starliner has achieved over 60% of the flight objectives, and this could reach over 85% once all the data from the spacecraft is retrieved and analyzed.

The spacecraft was later reused on the Boeing Crew Flight Test. Its commander, Sunita Williams, informally dubbed the spacecraft "Calypso" after the famed oceanographic research ship and its eponymous John Denver song.

== Anomalies ==
A software logic issue with the spacecraft's Mission Elapsed Time (MET) clock manifested 31 minutes into flight. Due to intermittent space-to-ground communication issues flight controllers could not correct the issue. This anomaly caused the spacecraft's Orbital Maneuvering Thrusters (OMT) to burn into an incorrect orbit causing too much propellant to be burned. This precluded a rendezvous and docking with the ISS. The mission was reduced to just three days, with the spacecraft successfully landing at White Sands Space Harbor on December 22, 2019.

After the mission, it was revealed that another critical software bug was found in flight, which could have resulted in the service module bumping back into Starliner after separation. The bug was fixed two hours before the capsule re-entered. Had the bug not been discovered and fixed, it may have damaged Starliner and prevented a safe landing. Additionally, it was determined that had the first anomaly not occurred, the second would not have been detected.

== Investigation ==
On February 7, 2020, NASA shared their preliminary findings about the Boeing OFT mission and discovered software problems with the Mission Elapsed Time (MET), which incorrectly polled time from the Atlas V booster nearly 11 hours prior to launch. Another software issue occurred within the Service Module (SM) Disposal Sequence, which incorrectly translated the SM disposal sequence into the SM Integrated Propulsion Controller (IPC). This could have made the service module crash into the capsule after separation, potentially leading to a catastrophic failure of the capsule. In addition, an Intermittent Space-to-Ground (S/G) forward link issue, which impeded the Flight Control team's ability to command and control the vehicle, was found. The investigation was expected to last until end of February 2020, and a full-scale safety review was planned that would likely take months.

On March 6, 2020, NASA gave an update on the anomalies. They announced 61 corrective actions that addressed the MET and service module disposal software issues. The mission was declared a "high visibility close call" as there were two times where the spacecraft could have been lost. NASA found factors internally that led to the anomalies such as the oversight over software.

On July 7, 2020, NASA and Boeing announced the completion of the Space-to-Ground communication issue, marking the completion of the OFT review. The number of corrective actions was increased to 80 from the March 2020 update. 21 recommendations focused on a need for more testing and simulations; including the necessity to do full end to end tests prior to flights instead of testing in chunks as done in the OFT. 10 recommendations were made to cover software requirements such that they have proper coverage to catch errors during testing. 35 of the recommendations surrounded improvements over process and operations such as including more reviews and use of experts. 7 recommendations covered software updates that addresses the three main anomalies that occurred during the flight. The final 7 included "Knowledge Capture" and Boeing organizational changes to enable better safety reporting. They also included hardware changes to filter out radio interference and others to address the communication issue.

Internally within NASA the investigation found that the lack of oversight over Starliner software was from NASA's focus of resources on other high risk parts of the flight. In addition, NASA may have had less oversight due to Boeing's traditional systems development style compared to SpaceX; NASA had increased their oversight of SpaceX due to their different working practices. NASA made 6 recommendations internally to prevent similar occurrences in the future. This included the need for NASA to review and approve the contractors' "hazard verification tests plans" before the test.

== See also ==
- Crew Dragon
  - Crew Dragon Demo-1, SpaceX's first (uncrewed) orbital mission with Crew Dragon
  - Crew Dragon Demo-2, SpaceX's second orbital and first crewed mission with Crew Dragon
