= Boeing Orbital Flight Test 2 =

Uncrewed flight test of the Boeing Starliner spacecraft

Boeing Orbital Flight Test-2
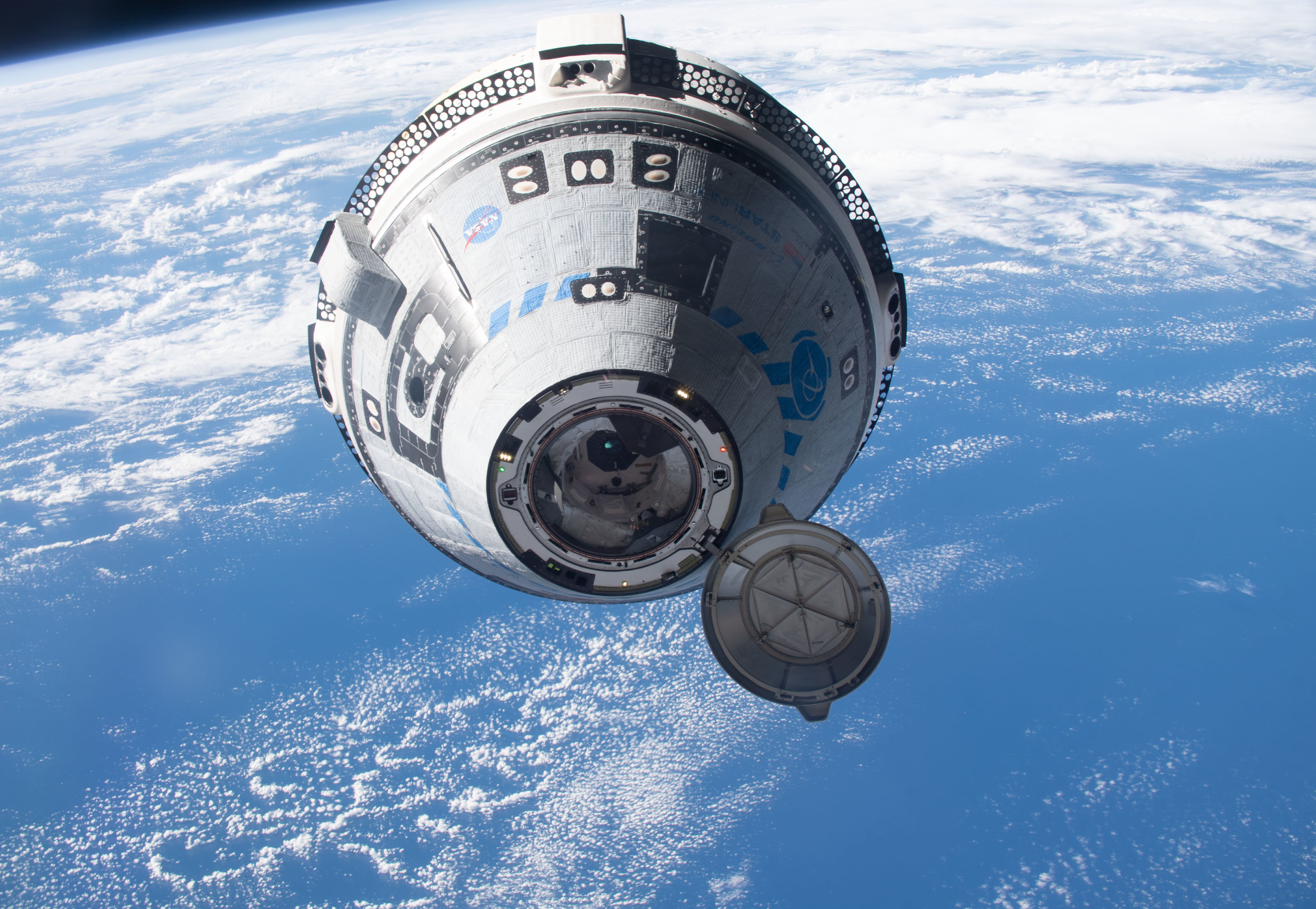
- Starliner approaches the ISS
- Names: Boe-OFT-2
- Mission type: Flight test
- Operator: Boeing Defense, Space & Security
- COSPAR ID: 2022-055A
- SATCAT no.: 52715
- Mission duration: 5 days, 23 hours and 55 minutes

Spacecraft properties
- Spacecraft: Boeing Starliner Spacecraft 2
- Spacecraft type: Boeing Starliner
- Manufacturer: Boeing Defense, Space & Security
- Launch mass: 13,000 kg (29,000 lb)

Start of mission
- Launch date: 19 May 2022, 22:54:47 UTC
- Rocket: Atlas V N22 (Note: N22 designates that the Atlas V has no payload fairing, two solid rocket boosters, and two Centaur second-stage engines.); AV-082
- Launch site: Cape Canaveral, SLC-41
- Contractor: United Launch Alliance

End of mission
- Landing date: 25 May 2022, 22:49 UTC
- Landing site: White Sands Missile Range

Orbital parameters
- Reference system: Geocentric orbit
- Regime: Low Earth orbit
- Inclination: 51.66°

Docking with ISS
- Docking port: Harmony forward
- Docking date: 21 May 2022, 00:28 UTC
- Undocking date: 25 May 2022, 18:36 UTC
- Time docked: 4 days, 18 hours and 8 minutes
- Starliner Orbital Flight Test-2 mission patch by Boeing Commercial Crew Development Boeing Starliner flights

The Boeing Orbital Flight Test-2 (also known as Boe-OFT-2) was a repeat of Boeing's unsuccessful first Orbital Flight Test (Boe-OFT) of its Starliner spacecraft. The uncrewed mission was part of NASA's Commercial Crew Program. OFT-2, using Starliner Spacecraft 2, launched 19 May 2022 and lasted 6 days. Starliner successfully docked with the International Space Station (ISS) on 21 May 2022. It stayed at the ISS for 4 days before undocking and landing in the White Sands Missile Range on 25 May 2022.

== Payload ==
The capsule carried approximately 245 kg (540 lb) of supplies and test equipment to simulate future missions with astronauts and their cargo on board. Some of the cargo included flags from historically black colleges and universities and pins of Rosie the Riveter and 16 EMU water absorption pads.

Starliner was loaded with 500 pounds of cargo to bring to the ISS–mostly food with some small EVA components. Astronauts unloaded this cargo and replaced it with 600 pounds of nitrogen-oxygen recharge tanks to take down. Once on the ground, the tanks were to be refurbished and then flown again.

Starliner again carried the Anthropomorphic Test Device (ATD) Rosie (a.k.a. "Rosie the Rocketeer") for its second flight. It also carried a plush toy of Kerbal Space Program character Jebediah Kerman as a zero-G indicator.

== Mission ==
The first flight of Starliner after the December 2019 OFT-1 flight failed to rendezvous with the station due to software problems. Boeing and NASA agreed on another uncrewed flight test of the spacecraft's systems. As part of the original fixed-price contract this flight was paid by Boeing, at an estimated out-of-pocket cost to Boeing of US$410 million. The mission was planned to use the hardware, Starliner spacecraft, and Atlas V originally planned for use on the Boe-CFT crewed flight test.

The second Atlas V N22, designated AV-082, launched the Starliner spacecraft on its second uncrewed test flight to the International Space Station. The capsule docked with the space station, then returned to Earth to land in the Western United States after an orbital shakedown cruise ahead of Boeing Crewed Flight Test.

OFT-2 was the second flight of an Atlas V without a payload fairing and with a dual-engine Centaur upper stage. The dual-engine Centaur uses two RL10s and is required for Starliner flights in order to provide a launch trajectory that allows a safe abort at any point in the mission.

Boeing modified the design of the Starliner docking system after the OFT-1 flight, adding a hinged re-entry cover below the expendable nosecone for additional protection during the capsule's fiery descent through the atmosphere similar to the one used in the SpaceX Dragon 2 nosecone. This was tested on the OFT-2 mission. This flight also marked the first time that a spacecraft with NASA's docking system docked to the ISS, as Dragon’s docking system was designed by SpaceX themselves.

=== Launch delays ===
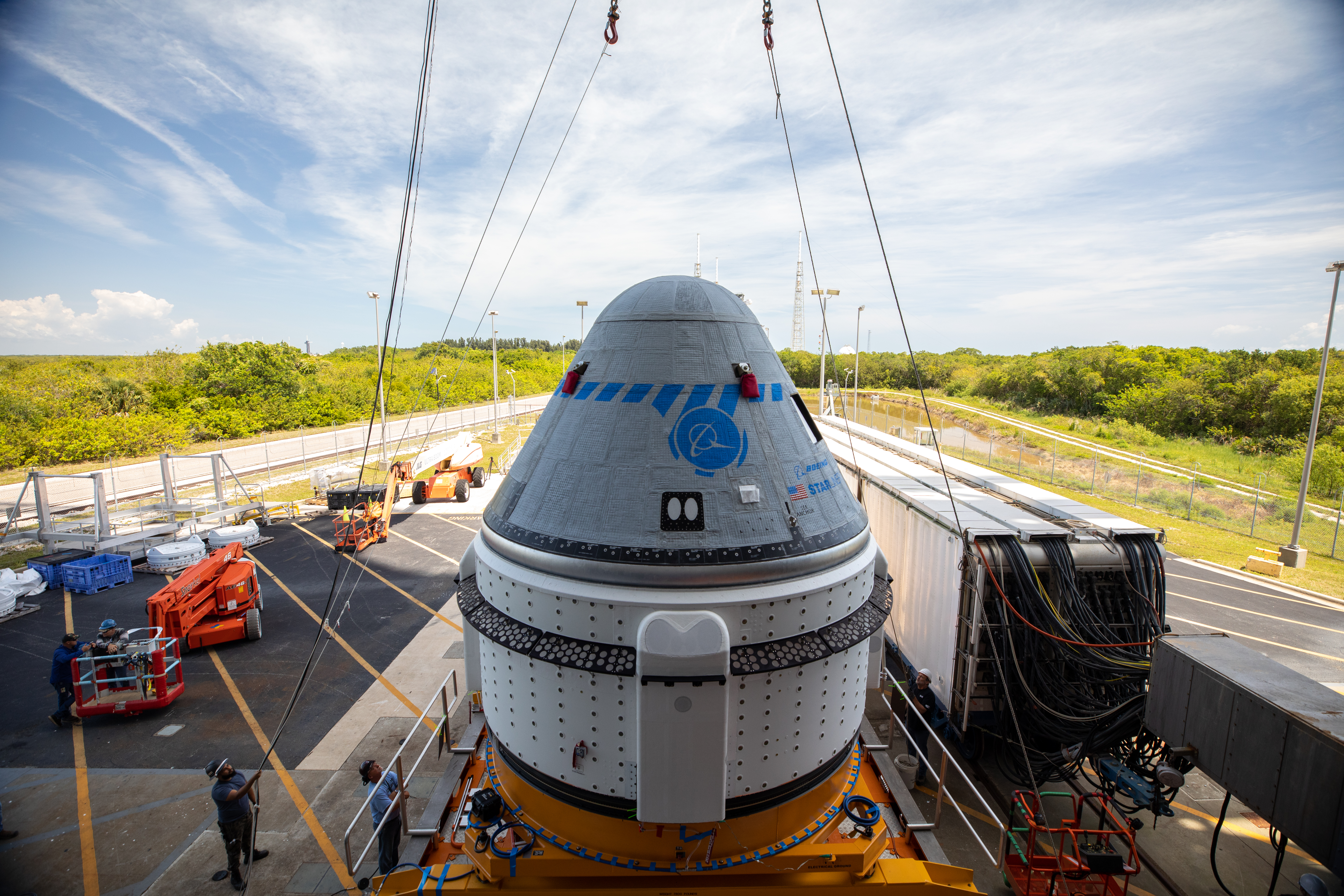
Boeing CST-100 Starliner for OFT-2 Arrives at SLC-41

On 9 December 2020, NASA and Boeing announced that 29 March 2021 was the targeted launch date for the OFT-2 mission. On 16 December 2020, Boeing officials released the official mission patch for the Orbital Flight Test-2 mission. On 18 January 2021, Boeing and NASA announced that they have re-certified Starliner's spacecraft software for the OFT-2 mission. In February 2021, the launch date shifted to 25 March 2021, then 2 April 2021, then mid April 2021. During April 2021, the launch was scheduled for August/September 2021, with an exact date to be determined. In May 2021, the OFT-2 launch was scheduled for 30 July 2021 at 18:53:32 UTC.

In preparation for this launch, the Crew Dragon Endeavour, which was docked to ISS at the Harmony forward port for its Crew-2 mission, undocked at 10:45 UTC and relocated to the Harmony zenith port on 21 July 2021, at 11:35 UTC. On 27 July 2021, NASA, Boeing, and ULA completed the flight readiness review (FRR) for the mission.

On 29 July 2021, the Atlas V with the Starliner atop had just been rolled out from the Vertical Integration Facility (VIF) to the pad at Cape Canaveral Space Launch Complex 41. In an entirely separate mission, the Nauka module had docked at the space station earlier that morning, but its thrusters misfired, causing serious problems that made the ISS unable to receive the OFT-2 visit until they were corrected. The Atlas V was immediately rolled back to the VIF, and the launch time was delayed to 3 August 2021 at 17:20:18 UTC.

=== Valve failures, August 2021 ===
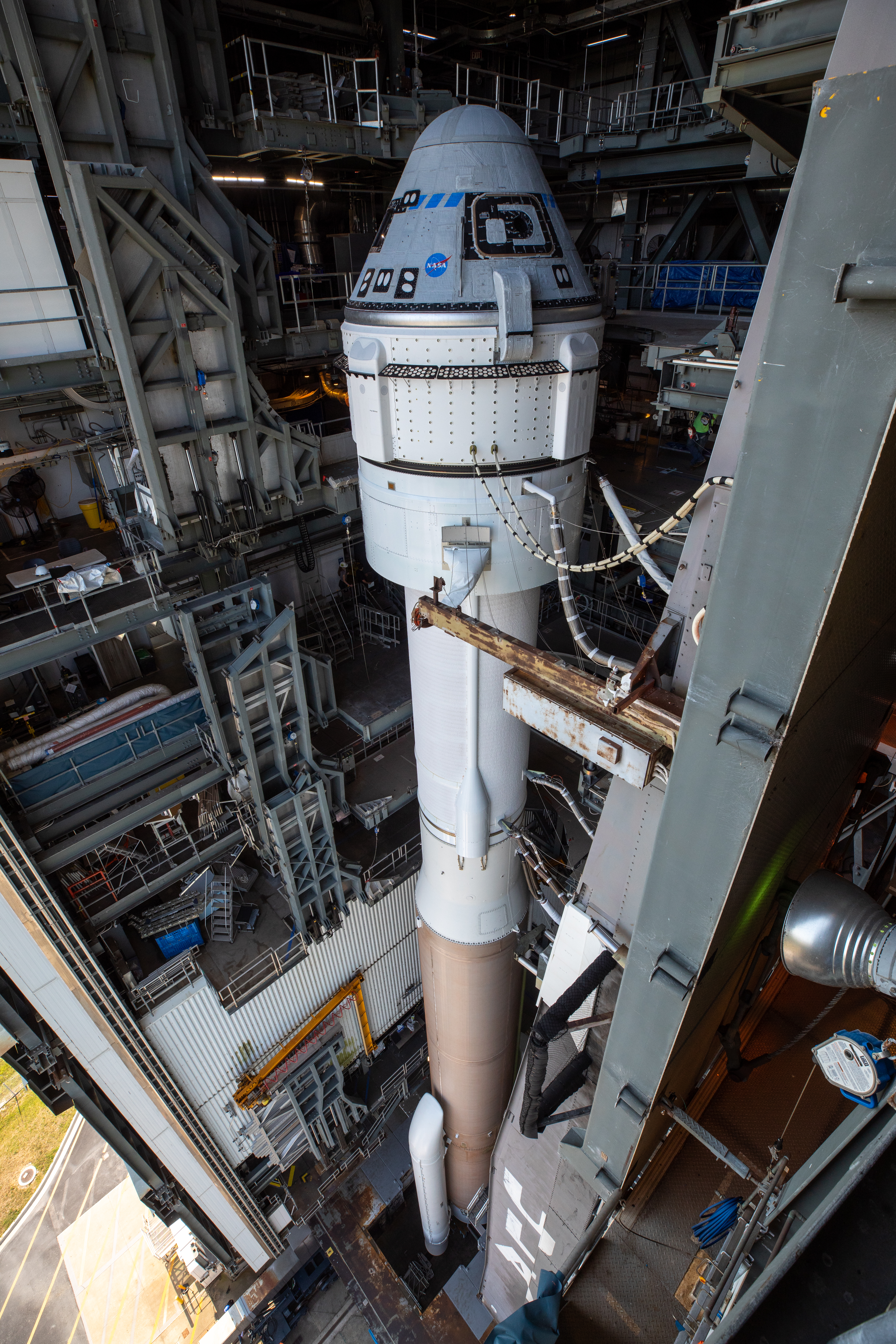
On May 18, 2022, CST-100 Starliner spacecraft and the ULA Atlas V rocket roll out from the Vertical Integration Facility to the launch pad

Atlas V was rolled out again 2 August 2021. The 3 August launch attempt was scrubbed due to technical problems with the propulsion system on Starliner causing another 24 hours recycle, with launch planned for 4 August 2021 at 16:57 UTC. Due to unexpected valve position indications in the Starliner propulsion system, the launch was further delayed to later in August while engineering teams investigated the problem. As a result, the Atlas V was rolled back to the VIF again for further testing. On 13 August 2021, Boeing decided to remove the spacecraft from the Atlas V and return it to the Commercial Crew and Cargo Processing Facility in order to perform a deeper-level troubleshooting of the thirteen propulsion system valves, causing the launch to be delayed for another year. The time needed for analysis and correction of the problem forced the launch to be delayed until the launch complex was once again available in May 2022.

=== Relaunch attempt ===
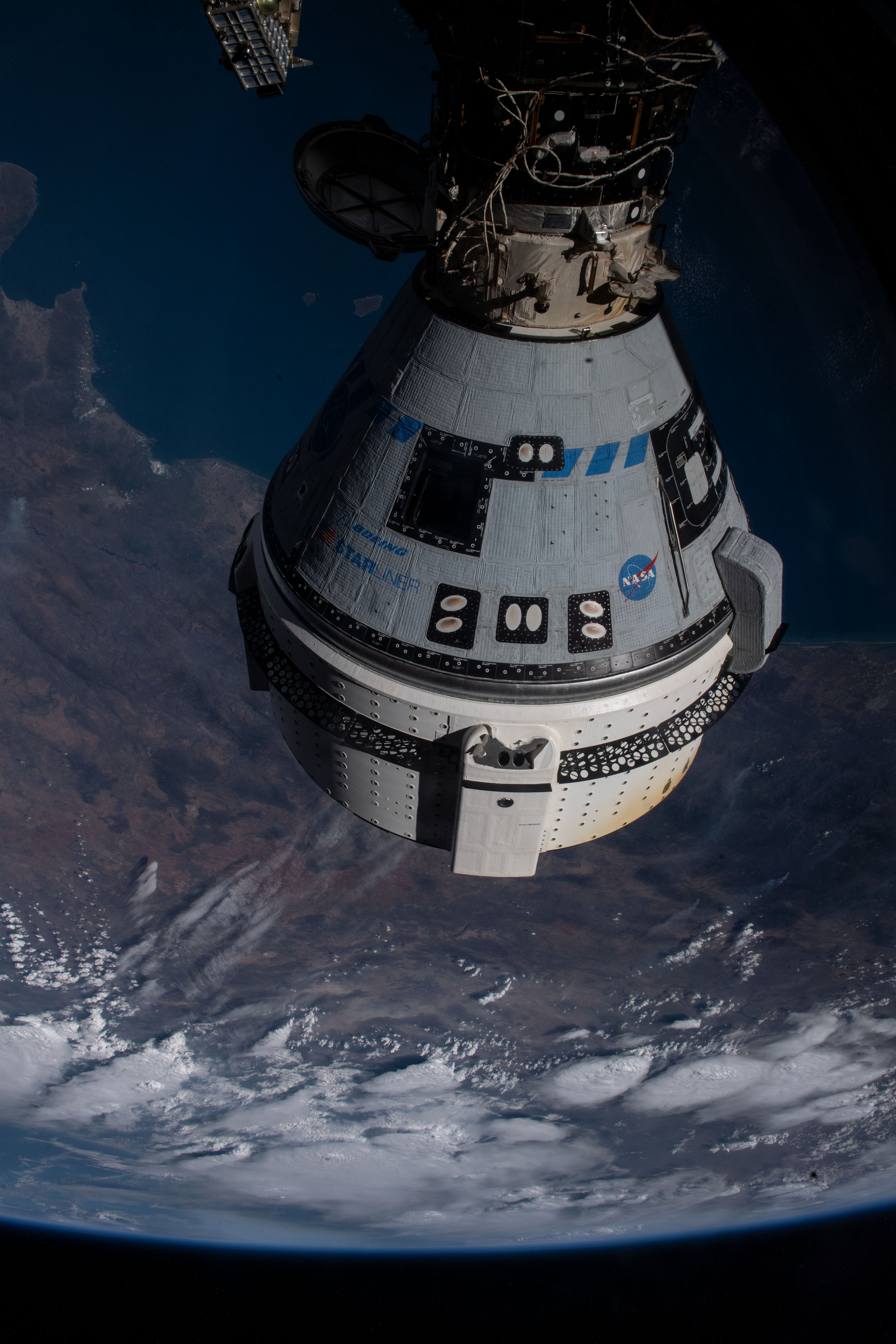
Starliner docked to ISS

After completing assembly of the rocket again at ULA's VIF, the launch took place on 19 May 2022 at 22:54 UTC, and completed the orbital insertion burn at 31 minutes into the mission. During this burn, two OMAC thrusters out of the twelve thrusters in the service module failed shortly after ignition, but the on-board flight control system switched to backup thrusters to complete the burn successfully, and Starliner reached a good orbit. 26 hours and 34 minutes after the beginning of the mission, Starliner achieved soft capture on its first docking attempt. 20 minutes later, the spacecraft achieved hard capture. Docking took place after a delay of about one hour, due to a need to retract and re-extend the ring clamp on its NDS docking interface. On 21 May at 16:04 UTC, the hatch was opened for the first time. On 24 May at 19:00 UTC the hatch was closed in preparation for departure. On 25 May at 18:36 UTC, Starliner undocked from the ISS and successfully landed in White Sands, New Mexico, at 22:49 UTC.

== Gallery ==
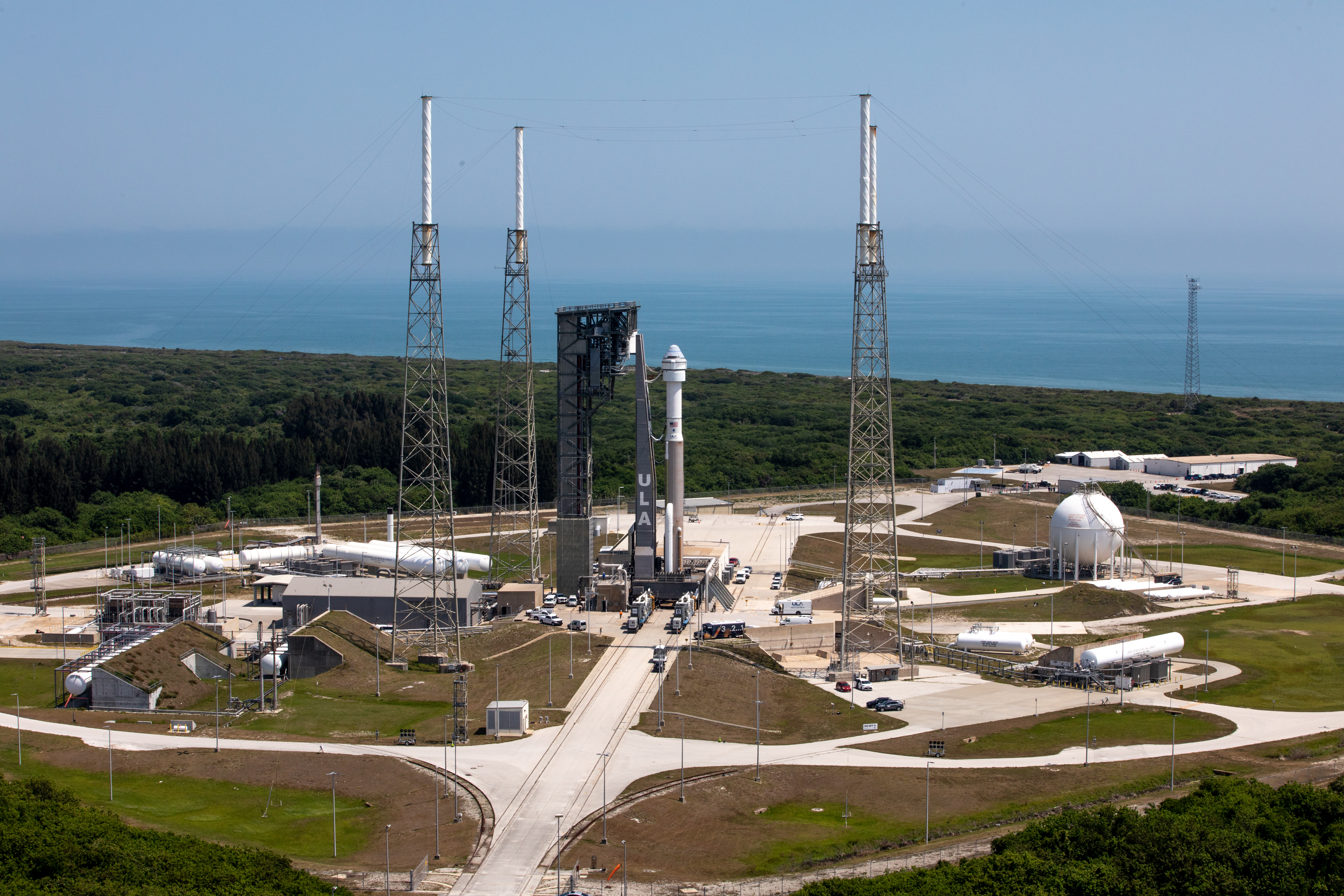
CST-100 Starliner spacecraft and Atlas V rocket roll out from the Vertical Integration Facility to the launch pad

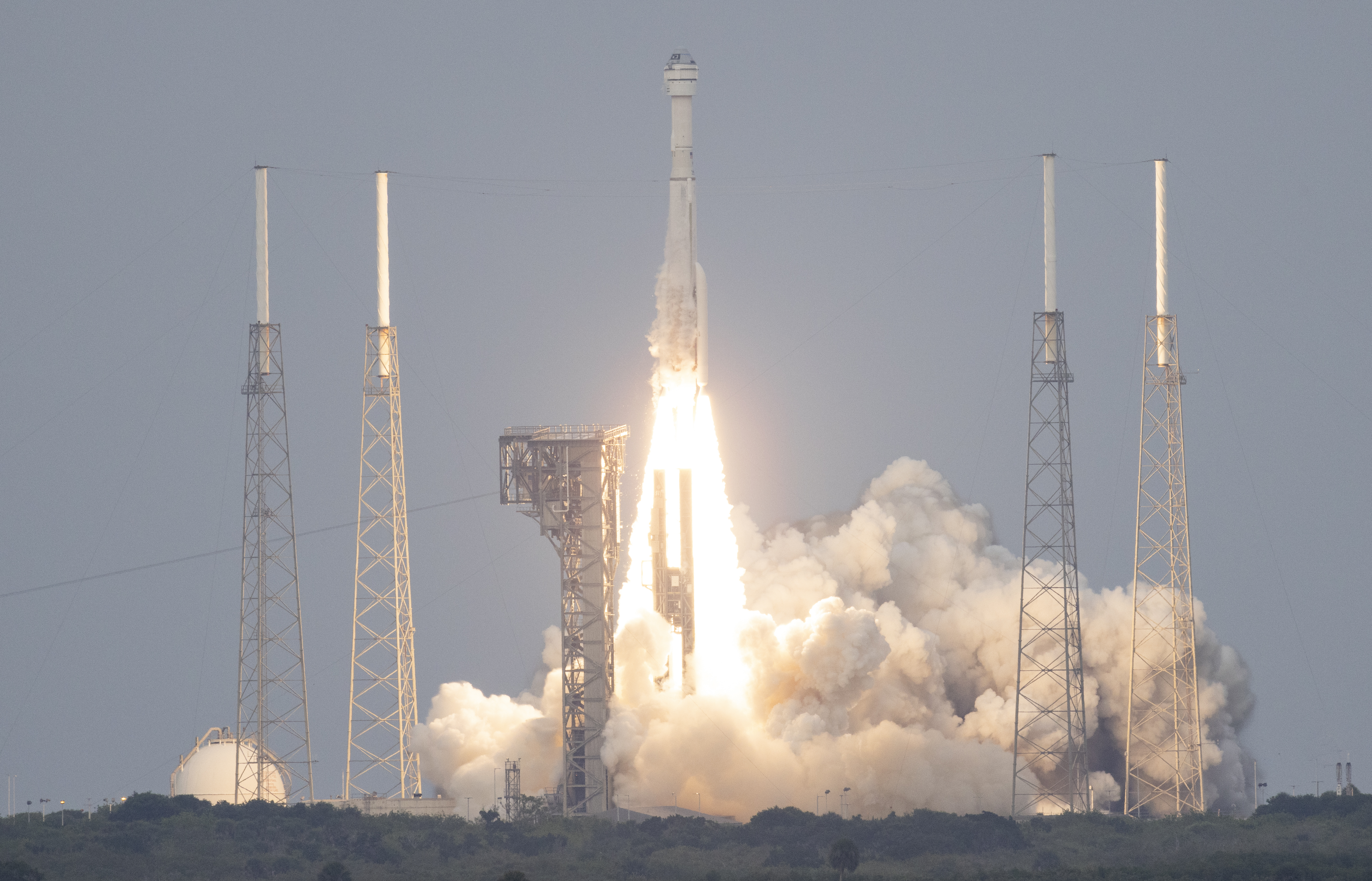
OFT-2 launches on an Atlas V

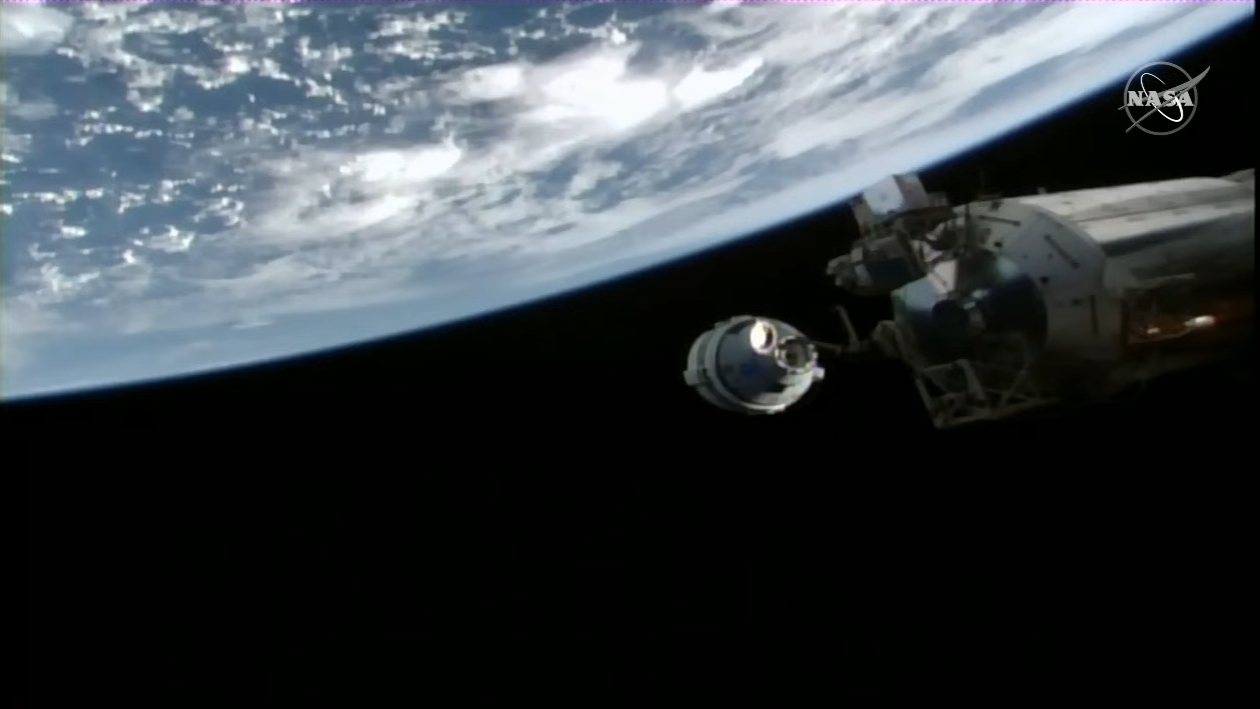
Starliner seen approaching the ISS

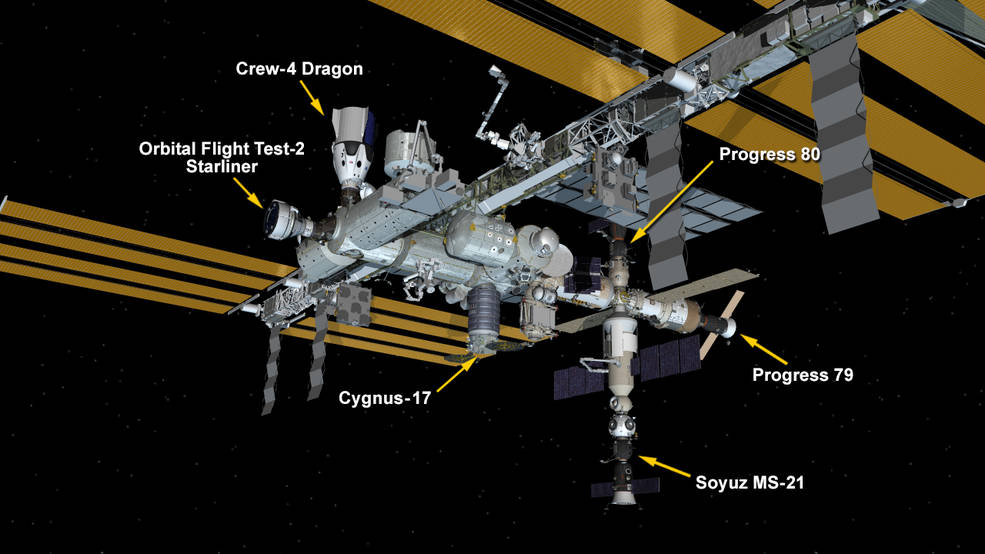
Both commercial Crew vehicles Crew Dragon and Starliner docked to ports on harmony module at the same time

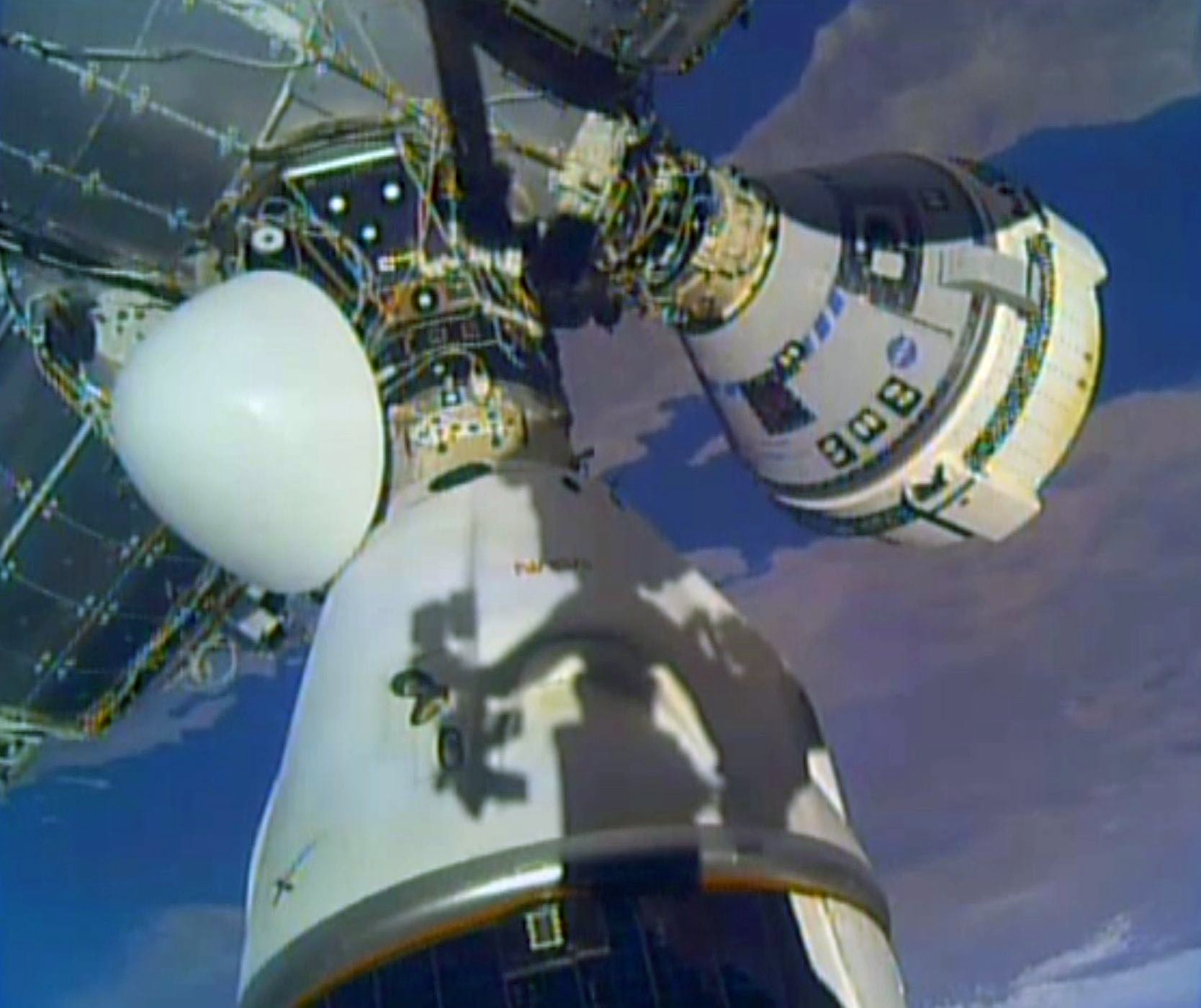
Commercial Crew Program vehicles Starliner and Dragon

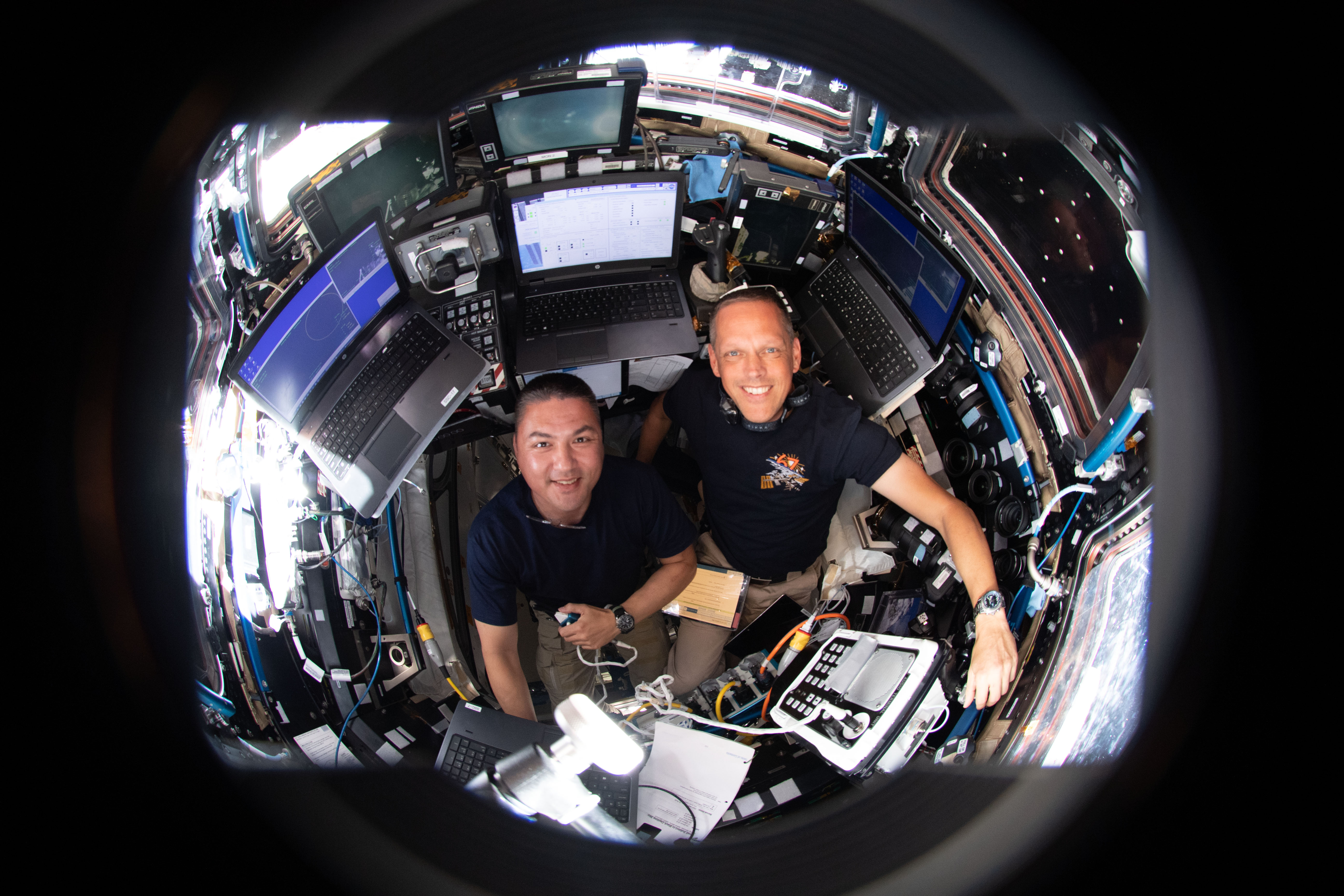
NASA astronauts Kjell Lindgren and Bob Hines monitor Starliner

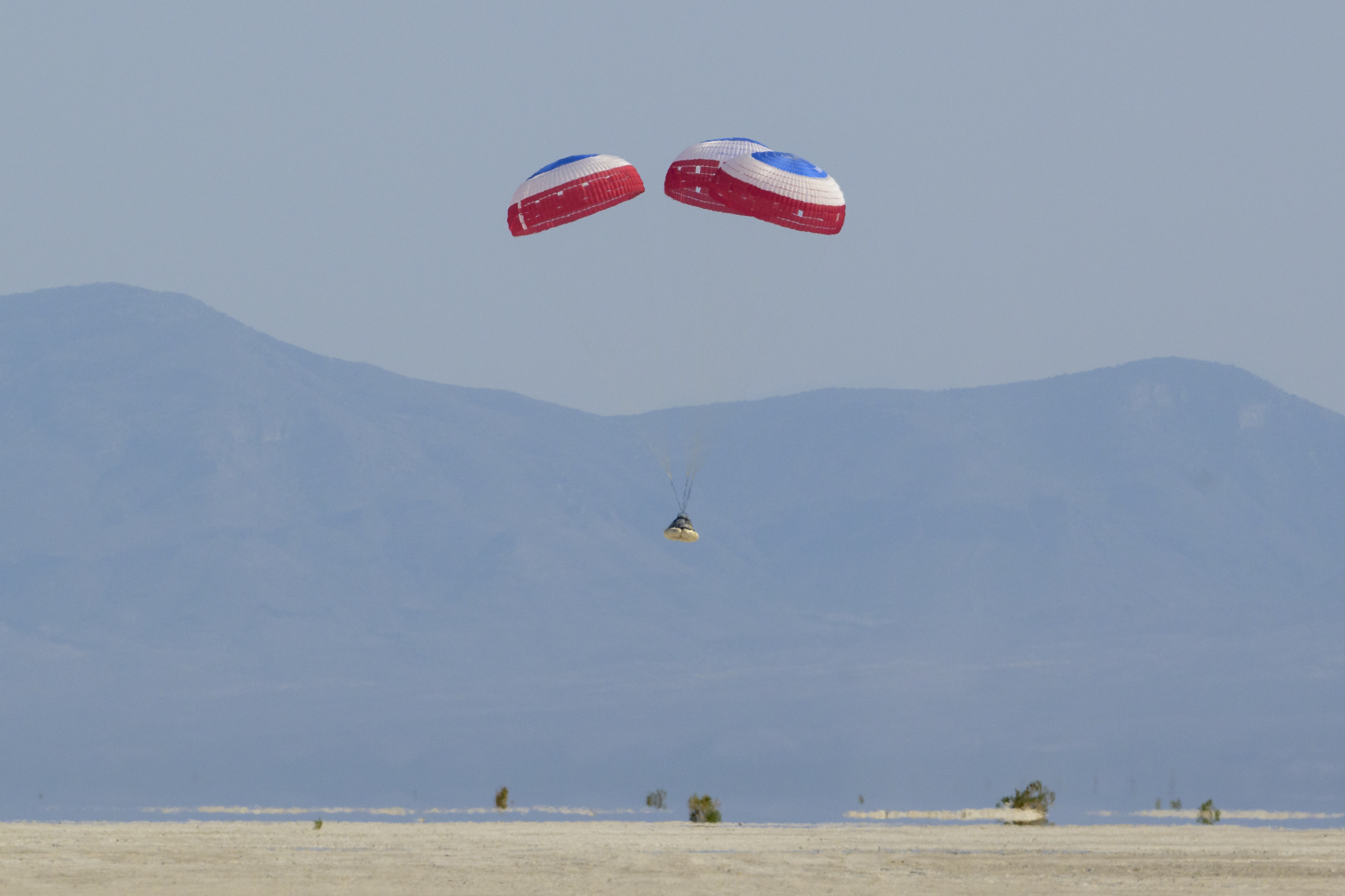
Starliner lands in White Sands, New Mexico

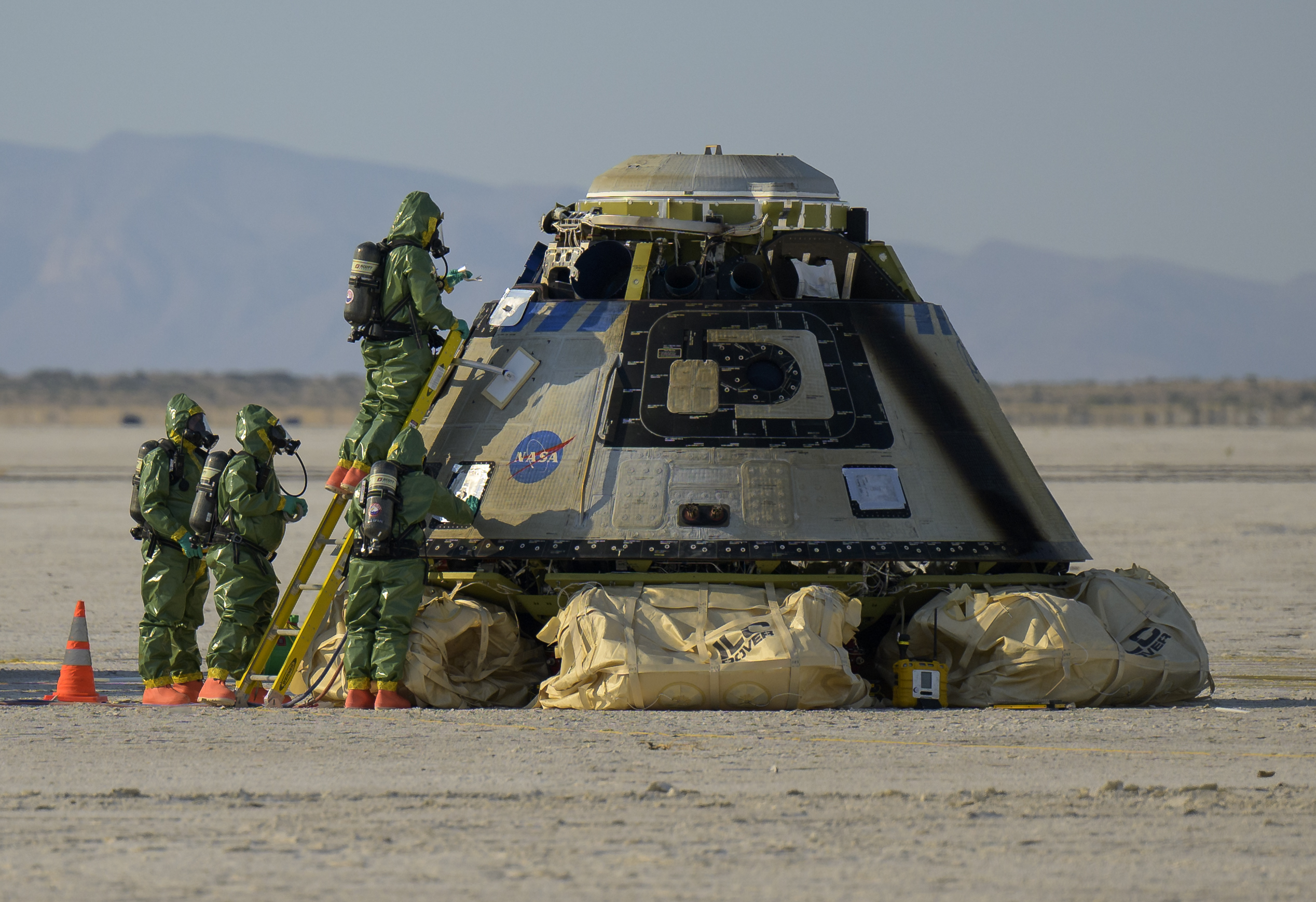
Starliner after landing

== See also ==
- Crew Dragon Demo-1, SpaceX's first (uncrewed) orbital mission for its crew capsule
