= Dragon 2 DragonFly =

SpaceX Dragon 2 spacecraft prototype

DragonFly
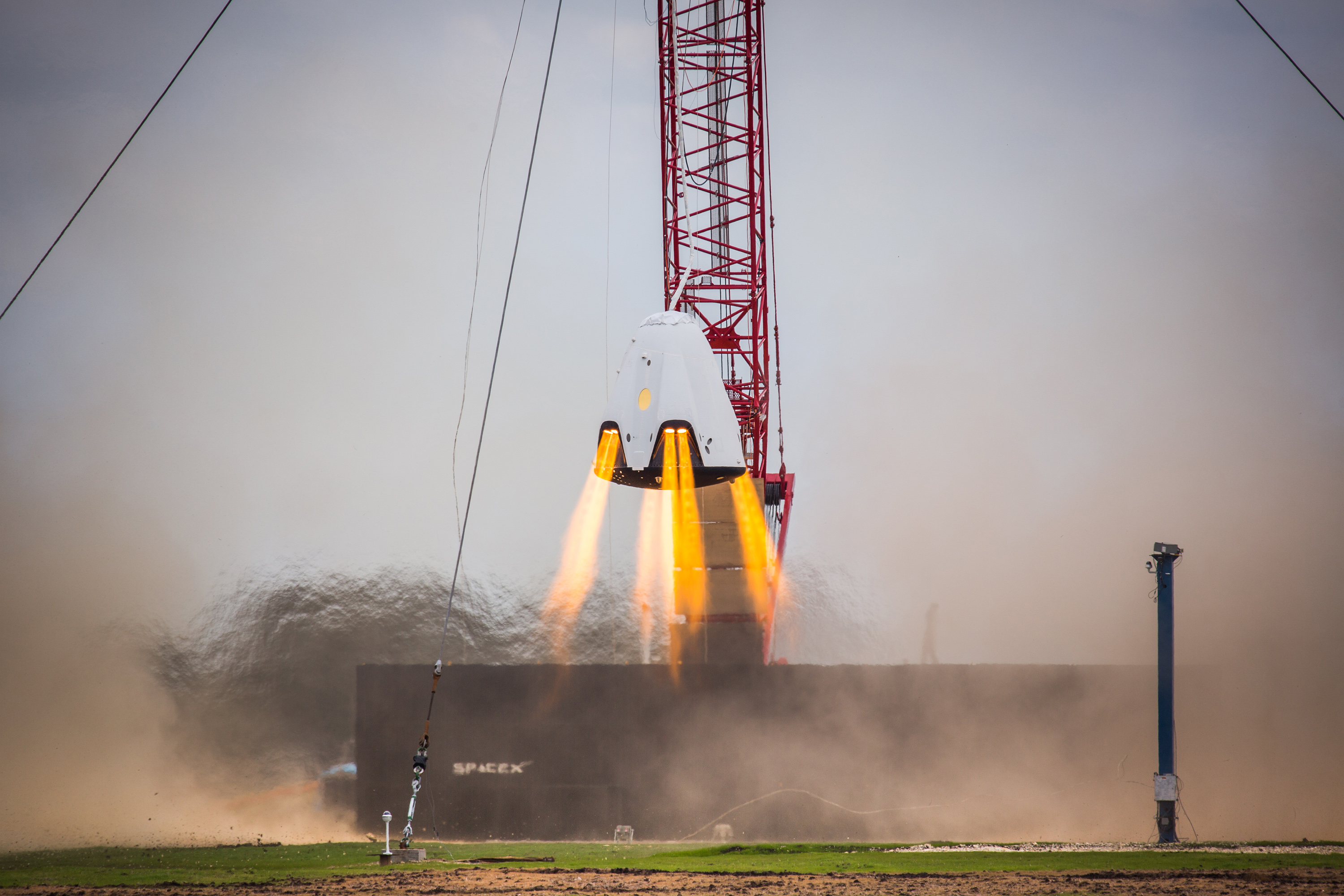
- A DragonFly hover test in November 2015.
- Type: Space capsule prototype
- Class: SpaceX Dragon 2
- Eponym: Dragonflies
- Serial no.: C201
- Owner: SpaceX
- Manufacturer: SpaceX

History
- First flight: 6 May 2015; Pad Abort Test
- Flights: 1
- Flight time: 109 seconds
- Fate: Retired

SpaceX Dragon 2s

The Dragon 2 DragonFly (Dragon C201) was a prototype suborbital rocket-powered test vehicle for a propulsively-landed version of the SpaceX Dragon 2. DragonFly underwent testing in Texas at the McGregor Rocket Test Facility in October 2015. However, the development eventually ceased, with SpaceX citing a verification burden imposed by NASA.

== Design ==
The DragonFly test vehicle is powered by eight SuperDraco hypergolic rocket engines, arranged in a redundant pattern to support fault-tolerance in the propulsion system design. SuperDracos use a storable propellant combination of monomethylhydrazine (MMH) fuel and nitrogen tetroxide oxidizer (NTO), the same propellants used in the much smaller Draco thrusters designed for attitude control and maneuvering on the first-generation Dragon spacecraft. While SuperDraco engines are capable of 73,000 newtons (16,400 lbf) of thrust, during use on DragonFly flight test vehicle, each will be throttled to less than 68,170 newtons (15,325 lbf) to maintain vehicle stability.

== History ==
In May 2014, SpaceX publicly announced an extensive test program for a propulsively-landed space capsule called DragonFly. The tests were to be run in Texas at the McGregor Rocket Test Facility in 2014–2015. A flight test program of up to 60 flights was proposed.

An outline for thirty of those flights included two propulsive assist (parachutes plus thrusters) and two propulsive landing (no parachutes) landing-only test flights, where DragonFly would be dropped from a helicopter at an altitude of approximately 3,000 meters (10,000 ft). The other 26 test flights were projected to be vertical takeoff, vertical landing (VTVL) test flights that would take off from a purpose-built pad: eight were to be propulsive assist hops (landing with parachutes plus thrusters) and 18 were to be full propulsive hops, where the landing is made with only rocket propulsion, similar to the Grasshopper and F9R Dev booster stage test flights that SpaceX also flew out of their McGregor facility.

Test flights were planned to include a subset of tests that would test both the DragonFly space capsule and the attached trunk, an unpressurized structure that typically carries mission-specific cargo and houses the power supply system for Dragon orbital flights. The others were planned to be test landings of only the capsule itself, without the trunk.

A Final Environmental Assessment was issued by the FAA in August 2014. The FAA determined that the DragonFly test program "would not significantly impact the quality of the human environment." The assessment estimated that the program would take two years for SpaceX to complete and considered a total of 30 annual operations of the DragonFly test vehicle in each year of operation. SpaceX received a renewal permit from the FAA on July 29, 2016, to continue another year of flight testing.

The DragonFly test vehicle—formerly the Dragon2 test article that was used in the May 2015 pad abort test—was at McGregor for the start of the two-year test program by October 2015. However, the development eventually ceased as the verification burden imposed by NASA was too great to justify it.

== See also ==
- SpaceX Dragon 2
- SpaceX reusable launch system development program
