= Mission Elapsed Time =

Time scale used by NASA during their space missions

Mission Elapsed Time (MET) is used by NASA during their space missions, most notably during their Space Shuttle missions. Due to the fact that timing is very consequential in a mission, all events after launch are scheduled on the Mission Elapsed Time. This avoids the constant rescheduling of events in case the launchtime slips. The MET-clock is set to zero at the moment of liftoff and counts forward in normal days, hours, minutes, and seconds. For example, 2:03:45:18 MET means it has been 2 days, 3 hours, 45 minutes, and 18 seconds since liftoff. MET was formerly called Ground Elapsed Time (GET) until the 1981 launch of the Space Shuttle.

The International Space Station (ISS) does not use an MET clock since it is a "permanent" and international mission. The ISS observes Greenwich Mean Time (UTC/GMT). The shuttles also had UTC clocks so that the astronauts could easily figure out what the "official" time aboard ISS was.

In 2019, a test flight of the Boeing CST-100 Starliner spacecraft suffered a mission anomaly through an incorrectly set Mission Elapsed Time on the vehicle.
