= Learnhub =

Social learning network (2008–13)

LearnHub
- Website type: Social Learning Network
- Dissolved: 2013
- Owner: Savvica Inc.
- Website: learnhub.com
- Launched: March 2008; 18 years ago

LearnHub was a social learning network for international education run by Savvica Inc., an online learning company based in Toronto, Ontario, Canada. The website was launched in 2008 to help Indian students find higher education opportunities primarily in the US, the UK and Canada. The website was shut down in 2013 following closure of the company's Toronto headquarters. The site offered test preparation tools, a university program directory, student counselling and a career network.

In May 2010, LearnHub became the 30th most visited website in India. In June 2011 Learnhub was 13th most visited site in India and the most popular education website in India. This success was highly cyclical and was a result of the traffic spikes in May/June when Indian students were using the vast free test prep database housed on the site. As of December 2012, LearnHub closed its Toronto office and stopped updating its website, Twitter and Facebook pages, suggesting that the company was no longer operating. In April 2013, Top Hat Monocle announced that LearnHub co-founder and former CEO Malgosia Green became the company's new Chief Product Officer.

== Social learning network ==
LearnHub was a social learning network which used Web 2.0 to allow international students to form discussions concerning higher education and studying abroad. It was designed to allow people to share learning and knowledge in online communities.

== Test preparation ==
LearnHub offered free access to IIT-JEE, BITSAT, AIEEE, SAT, GMAT, GRE and TOEFL practice exams and question banks. The site included thousands of original practice test questions. Students could also check the government released results of IIT JEE on the website.

== Program directory ==
LearnHub had a program directory with information about university and college programs from the UK, the US, Canada, India and South Korea. These programs could be filtered by destination country, subject and education level.

== University and college directory ==
LearnHub contained articles about universities and colleges. These articles contained information about the location, campus, academic programs, tuition and financial aid. LearnHub had partnered with a variety of institutions, including public and private colleges and Universities, technical institutes, research institutions, and liberal arts colleges.

=== United States ===
| A - Z | |
|---|---|
| Adler School of Professional Psychology | Northern Arizona University |
| Arkansas Tech University | Northern Michigan |
| Ashland University | Northern Virginia Community College |
| Assumption College | Northwest Missouri State University |
| Augustana College | Ohio University |
| Bellarmine University | Oklahoma Christian University |
| Benedictine College | Oklahoma City University |
| Cabrini College | Otterbein College |
| California Flight Academy | Phoenix East Aviation |
| California State University, San Marcos | Post University |
| Centenary College | Sacred Heart University |
| Chicago School of Professional Psychology | Saint Francis University |
| College of Saint Benedict and Saint John's University | Southern Nazarene University |
| Concordia College (Moorhead) | Southern New Hampshire University |
| Concordia College (New York) | Southern Utah University |
| Daemen College | Spring Arbor University |
| DeVry University | Spring Hill College |
| Dowling College | St. Catherine University |
| Drury University | St. Johns University |
| Eckerd College | Saint Mary's College |
| Emporia State University | St. Norbert College |
| Felician College | Ohio State University |
| Ferris State University | Thomas College |
| Fisher College | Troy University |
| Florida Southern College | University of Alabama Birmingham |
| Golden Gate University | University of Bridgeport |
| Guilford College | University of Findlay |
| Hope College | University of Kentucky |
| Indiana Tech | University of New Haven |
| Kaplan University Online | University of North Dakota |
| Kent State University | University of Northern Iowa |
| Kutztown University of Pennsylvania | University of Rochester |
| Lafayette College | University of South Carolina |
| LeTourneau University | University of the Pacific |
| Loras College | University of Wisconsin–La Crosse |
| Lynn University | Ursuline College |
| Manchester College | US Flight Academy |
| Marietta College | Valparaiso University |
| Mercer University | Virginia International University |
| Metropolitan College of New York | Walsh College |
| Midway University | Washington College |
| Midwestern State University | Western New England College |
| Mississippi College | Wittenberg University |
| Mississippi State University | Wright State University |
| National University (California) | |
| New England Institute of Technology | |
| North Carolina State University | |

=== United Kingdom ===
A - Z
London School of Business and Finance
Middlesex University
Sheffield Hallam University
University of Dundee
University of East Anglia
University of Stirling

=== Canada ===
A - Z
Algonquin College
Camosun College
Cape Breton University
Carleton University
Fanshawe College
North Island College
Royal Roads University
Selkirk College
Sheridan College
St. Francis Xavier University
St. Thomas University (New Brunswick)
Thompson Rivers University
University Canada West
University of the Fraser Valley
Vancouver Island University

=== India ===
A - Z
Indian School of Business and Finance
International School of Management Studies
School of Inspired Leadership

=== South Korea ===
A - Z
Solbridge International School of Business

== Student Counselling ==
LearnHub had an office in Gurgaon, Haryana, India. LearnHub student counsellors guided students with respect to admissions, entrance exam prep, financial aid and visas for universities and colleges around the world.

== Technology ==
LearnHub ran on an Open-source software stack, including Ruby on Rails.
