= Sunita Williams =

U.S. Navy officer and NASA astronaut (born 1965)

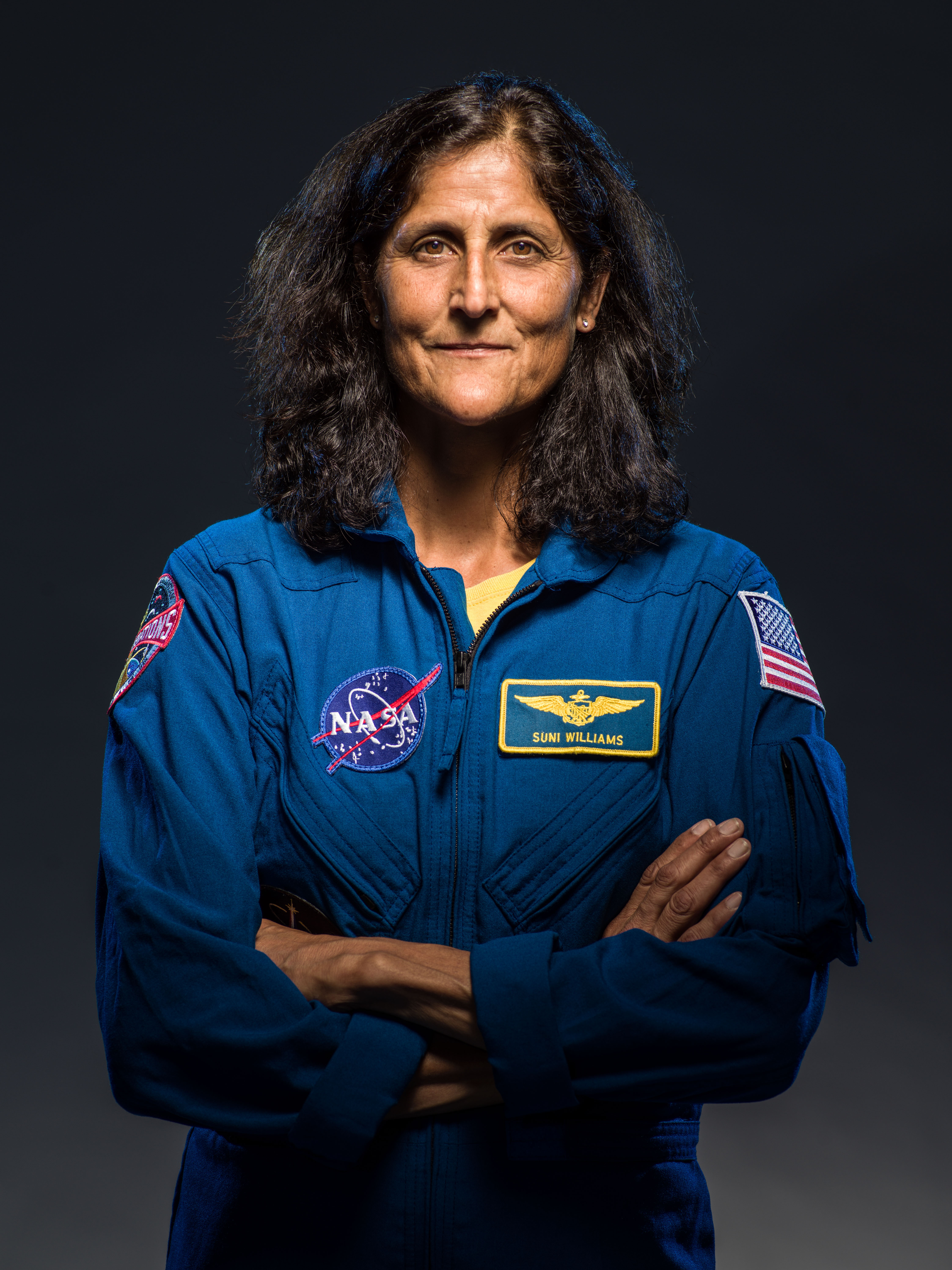
- Williams in 2018
- Born: Sunita Lyn Pandya; September 19, 1965 (age 61); Euclid, Ohio, US
- Other names: Sonika, Sončka, Suni, Sunita Pandya Williams
- Education: United States Naval Academy (BS); Florida Institute of Technology (MS)
- Spouse: Michael Williams
- Parents: Deepak Pandya (father); Ursuline Pandya (mother)
- Space career

NASA astronaut
- Rank: Captain, U.S. Navy
- Time in space: 608 days, 19 minutes
- Selection: NASA Group 17 (1998)
- Total EVAs: 9
- Total EVA time: 62 hours, 6 minutes
- Missions: STS-116/117 (Expedition 14/15); Soyuz TMA-05M (Expedition 32/33); Boeing Crew Flight Test/SpaceX Crew-9 (Expedition 71/72)
- Mission insignia
- Retired: December 27, 2025

Sunita Lyn Williams (Note: Gujarati: સુનીતા લિન્ વિલ્યમ્સ્, romanized: Sunītā Lin Vilyams) (née Pandya; (Note: Gujarati: પણ્ડ્યા, romanized: Paṇḍyā) born September 19, 1965) is an American retired Navy captain and NASA astronaut. Williams served aboard the International Space Station as a flight engineer for Expedition 14, Expedition 15, Expedition 32, and Expedition 71 and commander of Expedition 33 and Expedition 72. A member of NASA's Commercial Crew program, she became the first woman to fly on a flight test of an orbital spacecraft during the 2024 Boeing Crew Flight Test and had her stay extended by technical problems aboard the ISS for more than nine months. She is one of the most experienced spacewalkers: her nine spacewalks are second-most by a woman, and her total spacewalk time of 62 hours and 6 minutes is fourth overall and the most by a woman.

== Early life ==
Sunita Lyn Pandya was born on September 19, 1965, in Euclid, Ohio, and grew up in Needham, Massachusetts. Her father, Deepak Pandya, was a Nagar Brahmin neuroanatomist from India, while her mother, Ursuline Bonnie Pandya (née Zalokar) was a Slovene American. Her parents resided in Falmouth, Massachusetts. She is the youngest of three children. Her brother, Jay Thomas, is four years older and her sister, Dina Ann, is three years older. Williams has taken the flag of Slovenia, a samosa and Carniolan sausage to space in celebration of her Indian and Slovenian heritage. Her nicknames are Suni in the United States and Sončka in Slovenia.

Williams graduated from Needham High School in 1983. She received a Bachelor of Science degree in physical science from the United States Naval Academy in 1987, and a Master of Science degree in engineering management from Florida Institute of Technology in 1995.

== Military career ==
Williams was commissioned an ensign in the United States Navy in May 1987. After a six-month temporary assignment at the Naval Coastal System Command, she was designated a Basic Diving Officer. She next reported to the Naval Air Training Command, where she was designated a naval aviator in July 1989. She received initial H-46 Sea Knight training in Helicopter Combat Support Squadron 3 (HC-3), and was then assigned to Helicopter Combat Support Squadron 8 (HC-8) in Norfolk, Virginia, with which she made overseas deployments to the Mediterranean, Red Sea, and Persian Gulf for Operation Desert Shield and Operation Provide Comfort. In September 1992, she was the officer-in-charge of an H-46 detachment sent to Miami, Florida, for Hurricane Andrew relief operations aboard USS Sylvania. In January 1993, Williams began training at the U.S. Naval Test Pilot School. She graduated in December, and was assigned to the Rotary Wing Aircraft Test Directorate as an H-46 Project Officer and V-22 chase pilot in the T-2. Later, she was assigned as the squadron Safety Officer and flew test flights in the SH-60B/F, UH-1, AH-1W, SH-2, VH-3, H-46, CH-53, and H-57.

In December 1995, she went back to the Naval Test Pilot School as an instructor in the Rotary Wing Department and as the school's Safety Officer. There she flew the UH-60, OH-6, and the OH-58. She was then assigned to USS Saipan as the Aircraft Handler and the Assistant Air Boss. Williams was deployed on Saipan in June 1998 when she was selected by NASA for the astronaut program. She has logged more than 3,000 flight hours in more than 30 aircraft types. Williams retired from the Navy as a captain in 2017.

== Career in NASA ==
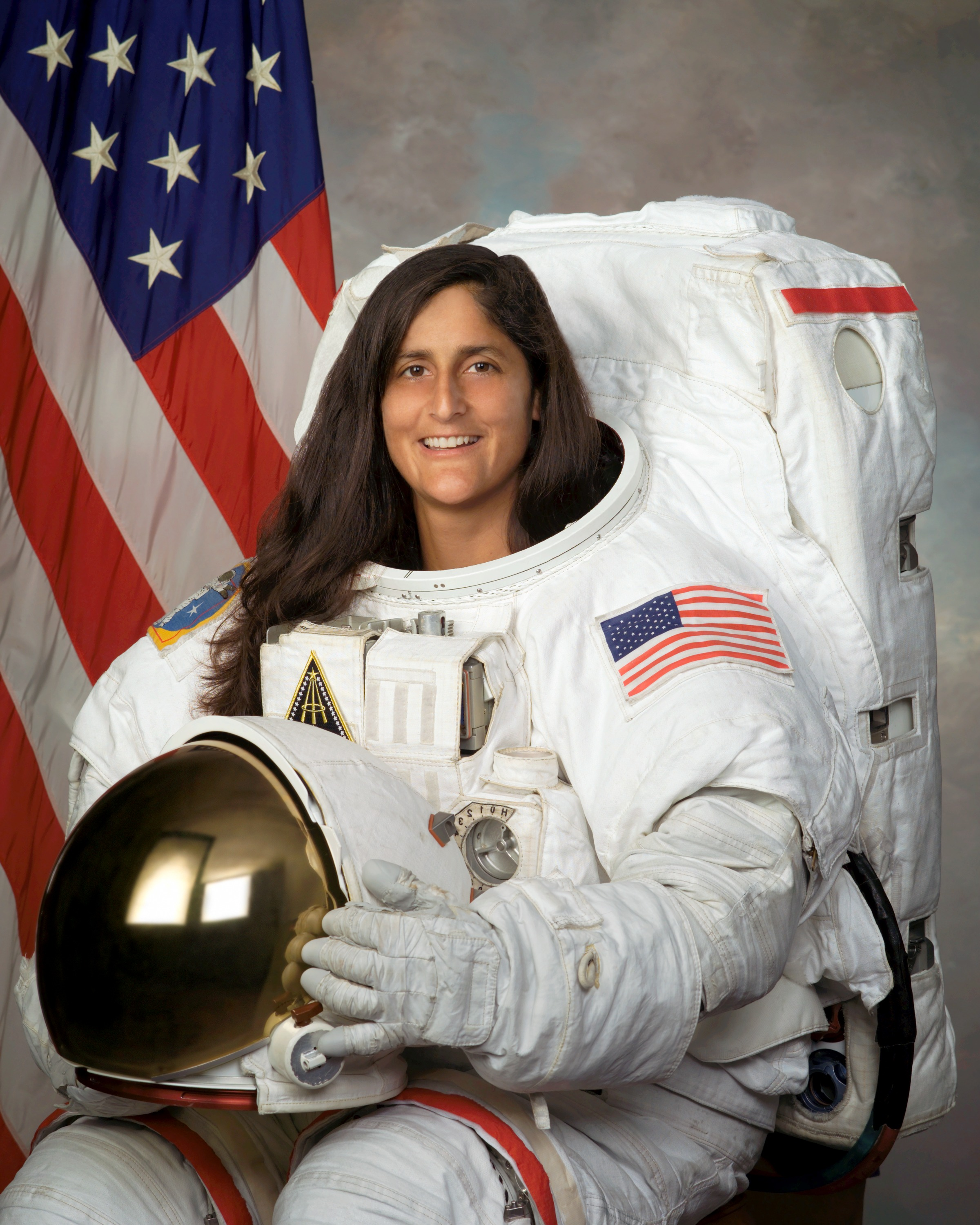
Williams in 2004

Williams began her astronaut candidate training at the Johnson Space Center in August 1998.

=== STS-116 ===
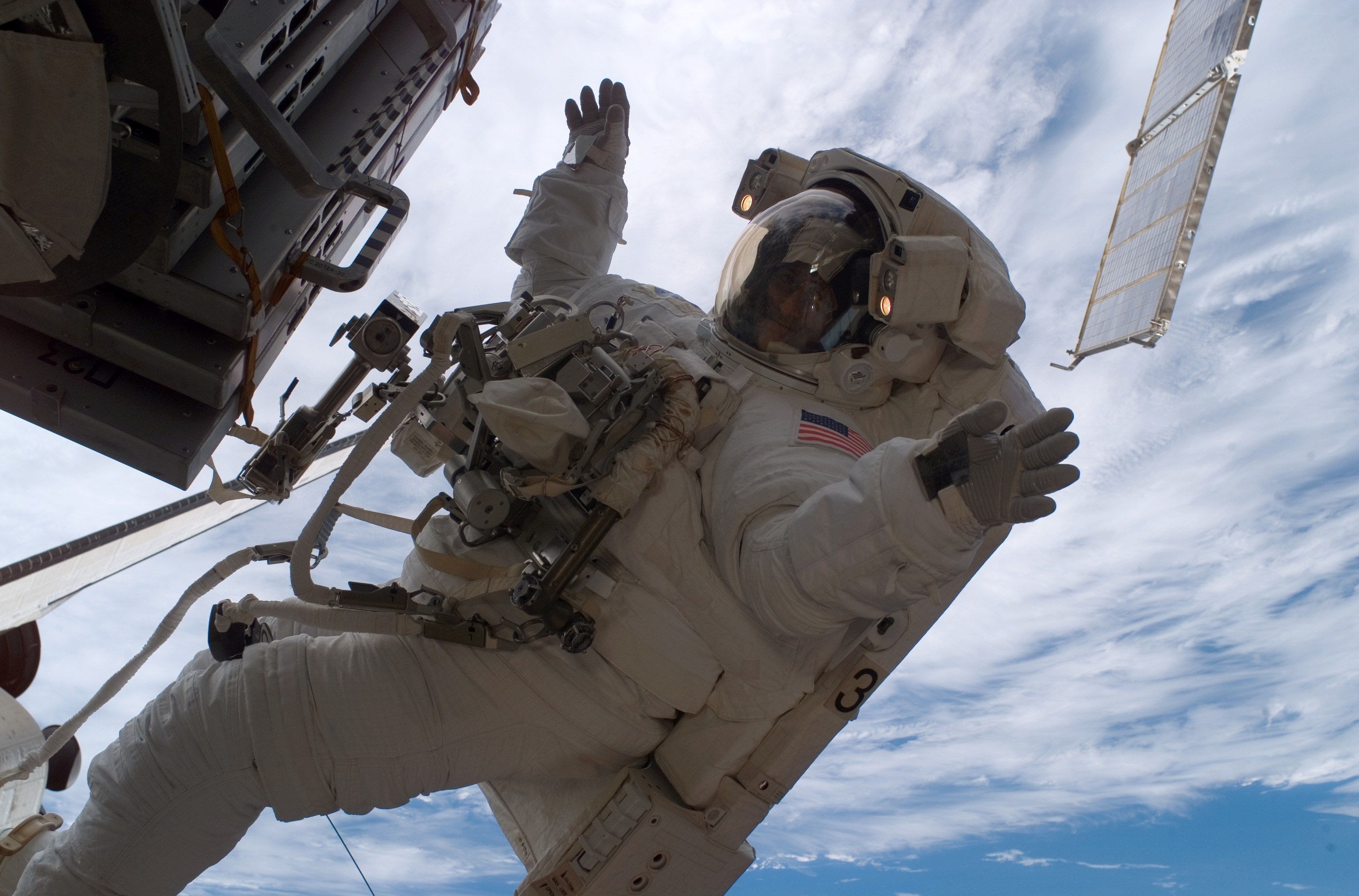
Astronaut Sunita L. Williams, STS-116 mission specialist, participates in the mission's third planned session of extravehicular activity (EVA)

Williams was launched to the International Space Station (ISS) with STS-116, aboard Space Shuttle Discovery, on December 9, 2006, to join the Expedition 14 crew. In April 2007, the Russian members of the crew rotated, changing to Expedition 15.

=== Expeditions 14 and 15 ===
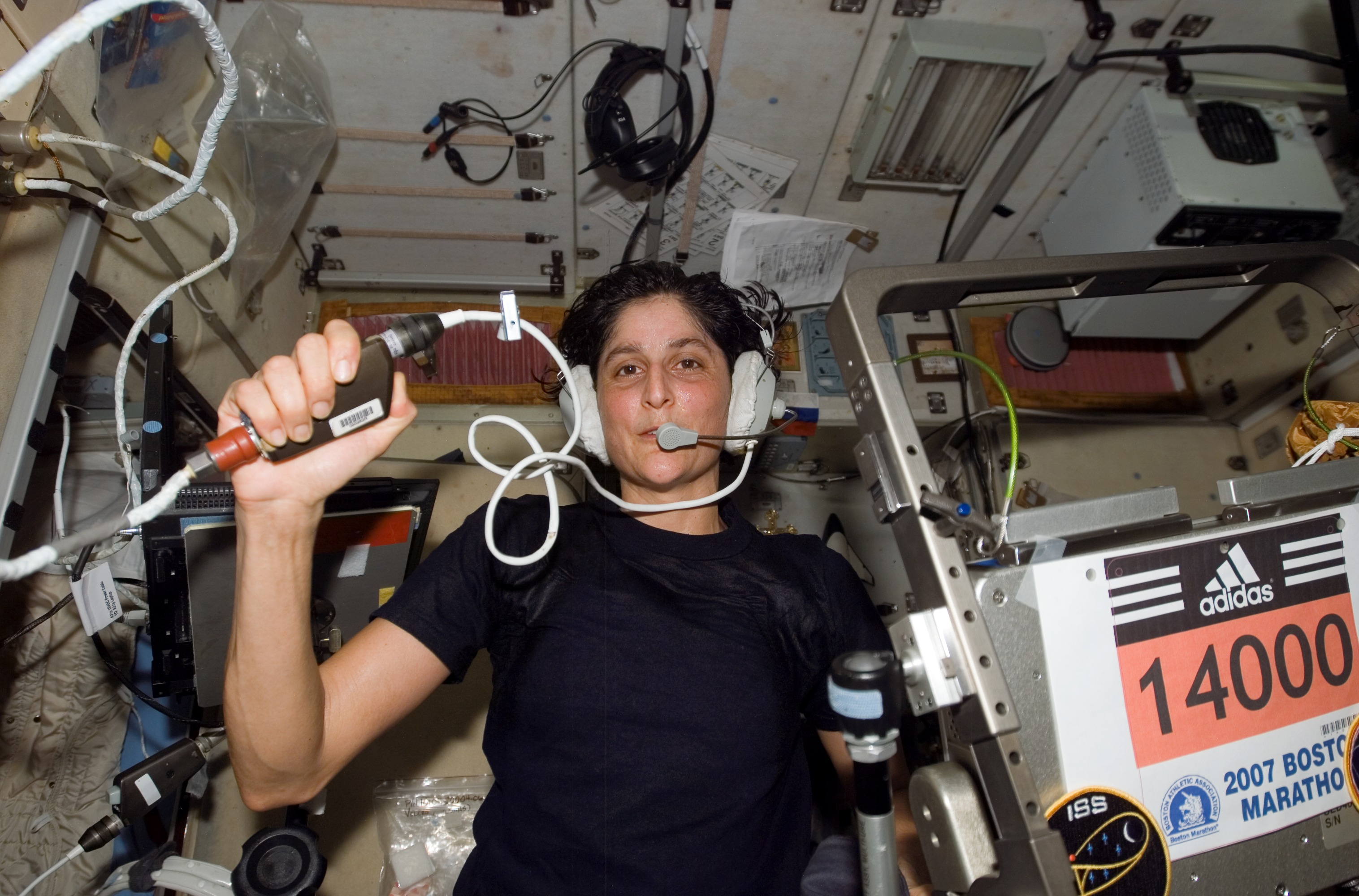
Williams became the first person to run a marathon from the space station on April 16, 2007

After launch, Williams arranged to donate her ponytail to Locks of Love. Fellow astronaut Joan Higginbotham cut her hair aboard the International Space Station and it was brought back to Earth by the STS-116 crew. Williams performed her first extra-vehicular activity on the eighth day of the STS-116 mission. On January 31, February 4, and February 9, 2007, she completed three spacewalks from the ISS with Michael López-Alegría. During one of these walks, a camera became untethered, probably because the attaching device failed, and floated off to space before Williams could react.

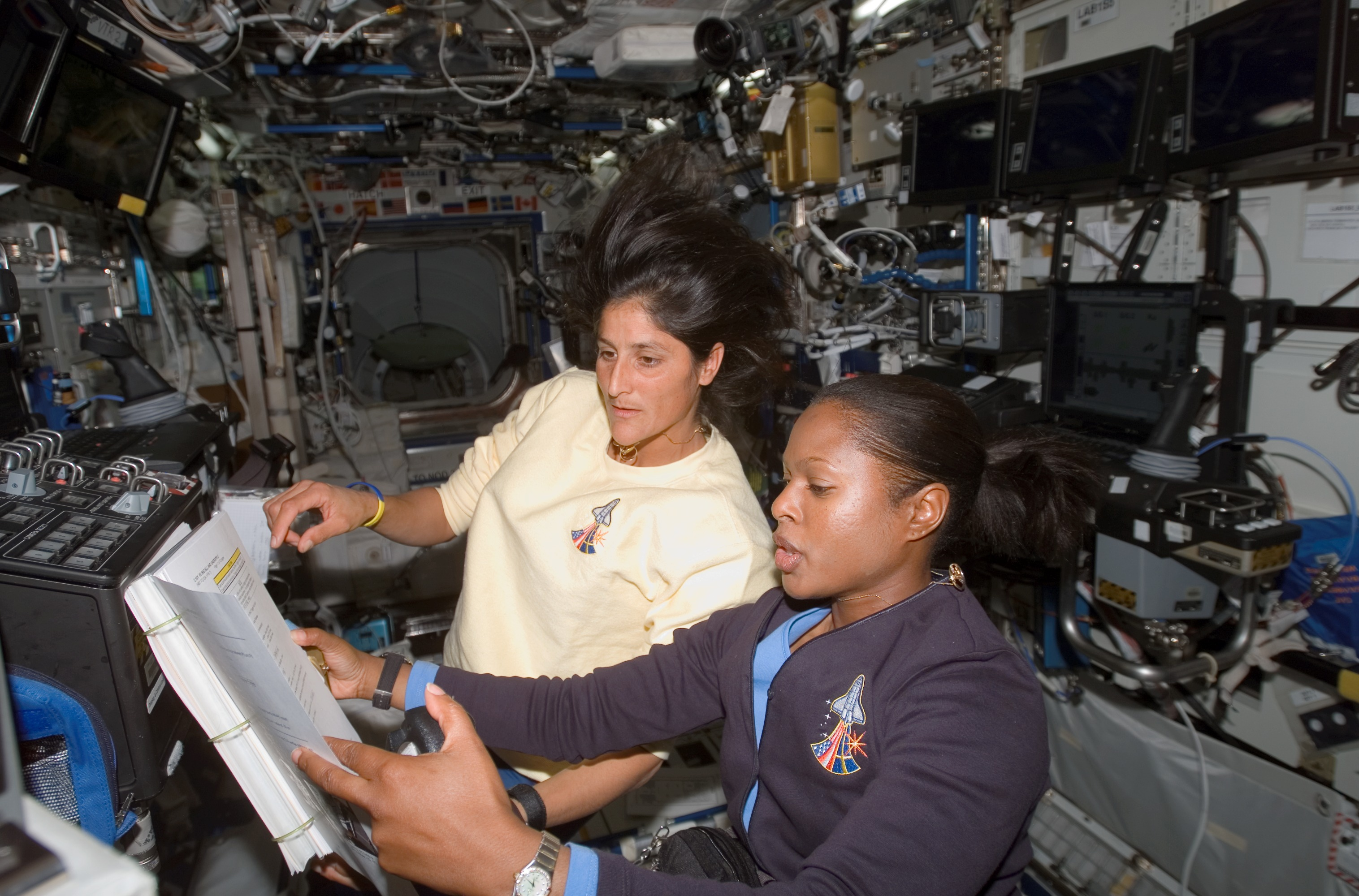
Joan Higginbotham and Williams work the controls of the Canadarm2 in the ISS's Destiny Laboratory

On the third spacewalk, Williams was outside the station for 6 hours and 40 minutes to complete three spacewalks in nine days. By 2007, she had logged 29 hours and 17 minutes in four spacewalks, eclipsing the record previously held by Kathryn C. Thornton for most spacewalk time by a woman. On December 18, 2007, during the fourth spacewalk of Expedition 16, Peggy Whitson surpassed Williams, with a cumulative EVA time of 32 hours, 36 minutes. In early March 2007, she received a tube of wasabi in a Progress spacecraft resupply mission in response to her request for more spicy food. When she opened the tube, which was packed at one atmospheric pressure, the paste was forced out in the lower pressure of the ISS. In the free-fall environment, the spicy geyser was difficult to contain.

On April 26, 2007, NASA decided to bring Williams back to Earth on the STS-117 mission aboard Atlantis. Although she did not break the U.S. single spaceflight record—recently set by López-Alegría—she did break the record for longest single spaceflight by a woman. Williams served as a mission specialist and returned to Earth on June 22, 2007, at the end of the STS-117 mission. Poor weather at the Kennedy Space Center in Cape Canaveral forced mission managers to skip three landing attempts there over 24 hours. They ultimately diverted Atlantis to Edwards Air Force Base in California, where the shuttle touched down at 3:49 p.m. EDT, returning Williams home after a 192-day stay in space.

=== Marathon in space ===
On April 16, 2007, she ran the first marathon by any person in space. Williams was listed as an entrant for the 2007 Boston Marathon, and completed the distance in 4 hours and 24 minutes. During the race, the other crew members cheered her on and tossed oranges to her. Williams's sister, Dina Pandya and fellow astronaut Karen L. Nyberg ran the marathon on Earth, and Williams received updates on their progress from Mission Control. In 2008, 2009 and 2026, Williams participated in the Boston Marathon again.

=== Expeditions 32 and 33 ===
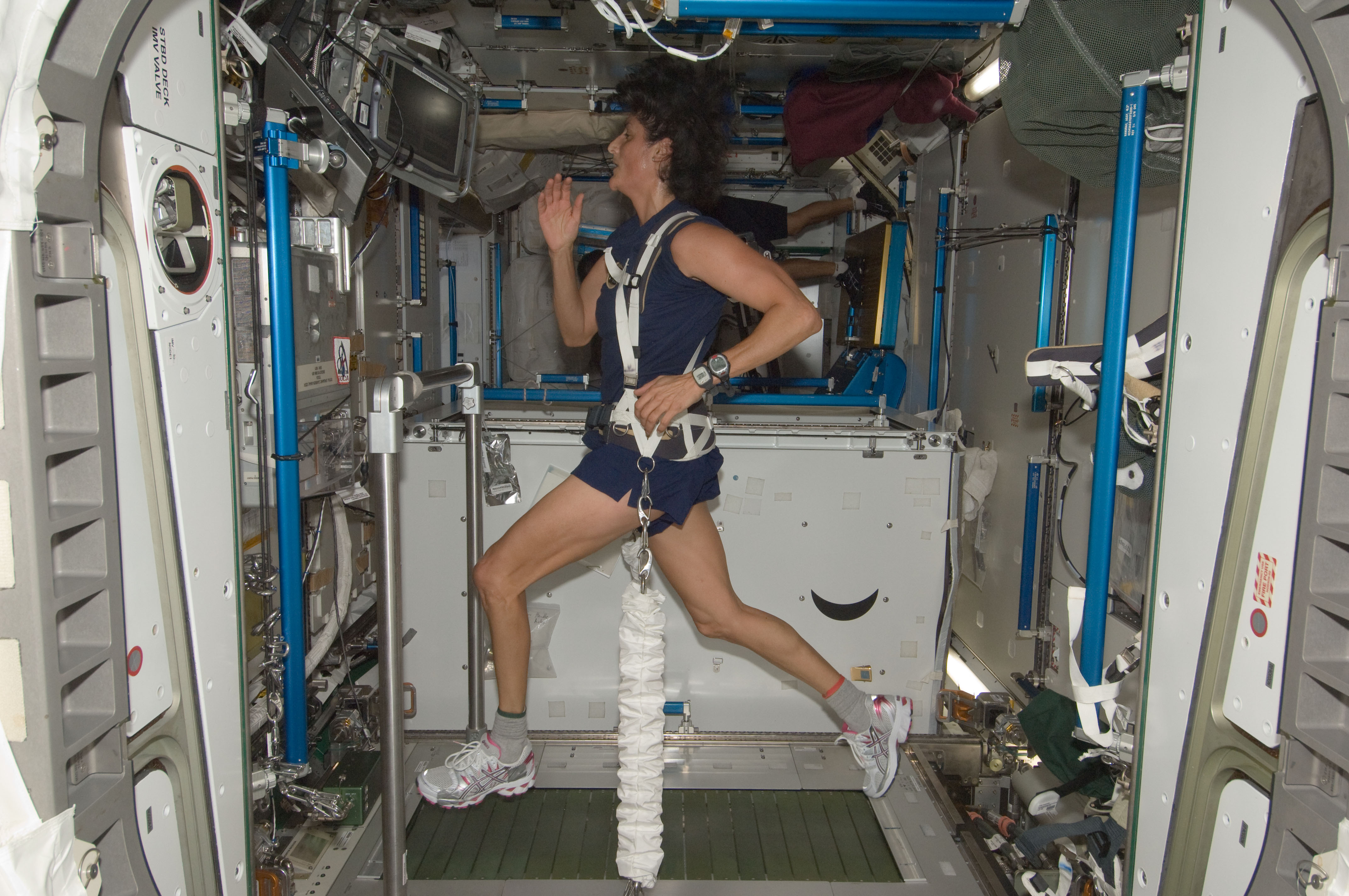
Williams exercises on COLBERT during ISS Expedition 32

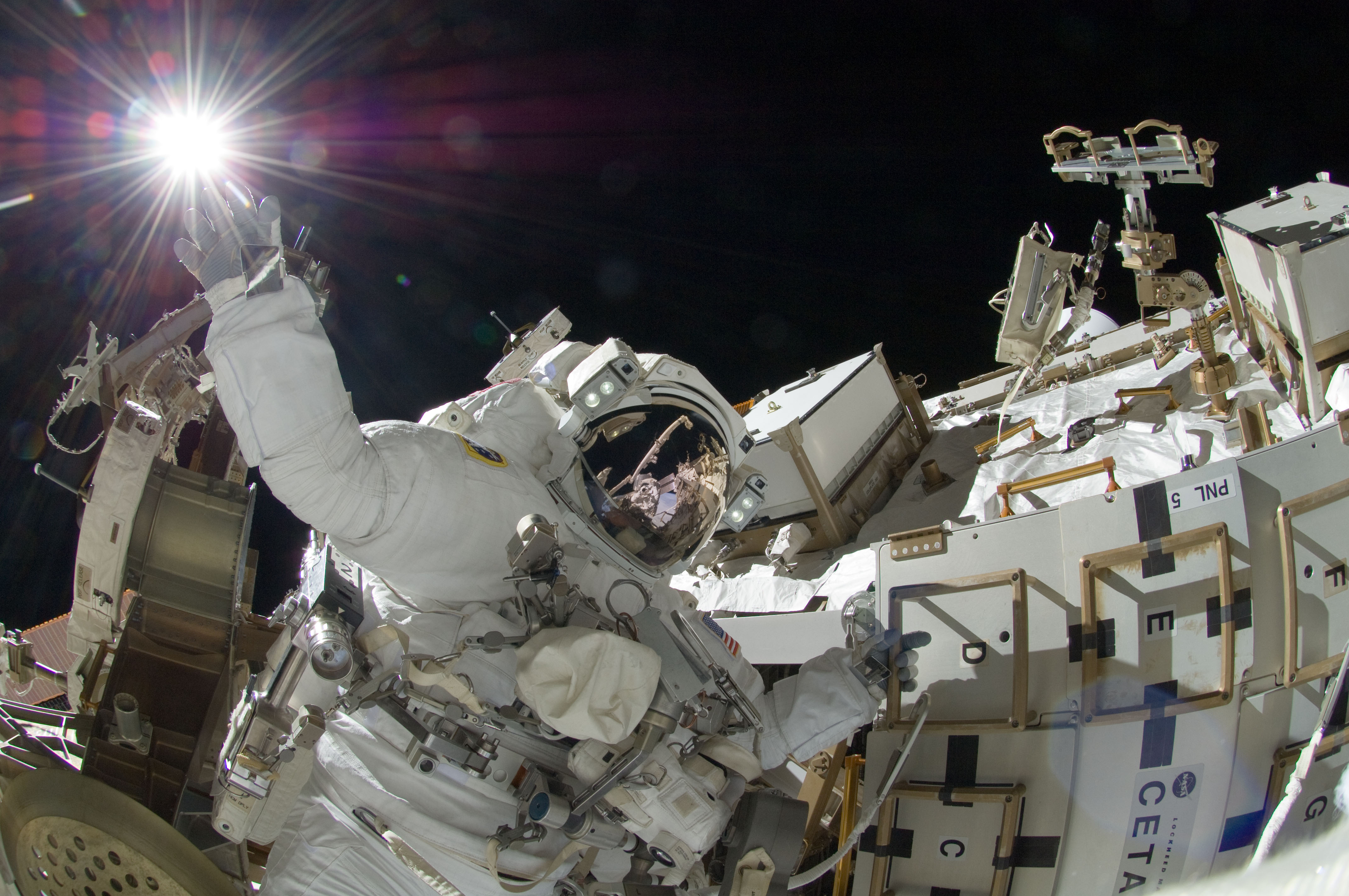
Williams appears to touch the bright Sun during a spacewalk conducted on September 5, 2012.

Williams was launched from the Baikonur Cosmodrome on July 15, 2012, as part of Expedition 32/33. Her Russian spacecraft Soyuz TMA-05M docked with the ISS for a four-month stay at the orbiting outpost on July 17, 2012. The docking of the Soyuz spacecraft occurred at 4:51 GMT as the ISS flew over Kazakhstan at an altitude of 252 miles. The hatchway between the Soyuz spacecraft and the ISS was opened at 7:23 GMT and Williams floated into the ISS to begin her duties as a member of the Expedition 32 crew. On the Soyuz spacecraft, she was accompanied by Japan Aerospace Exploration Agency (JAXA) astronaut Akihiko Hoshide and Russian cosmonaut Yuri Malenchenko. Williams served as the commander of the ISS during her stay onboard ISS Expedition 33, succeeding Gennady Padalka. She became the commander of the International Space Station on September 17, 2012, being only the second woman to achieve the feat. Also in September 2012, she became the first person to do a triathlon in space, which coincided with the Nautica Malibu Triathlon held in Southern California. She used the International Space Station's own treadmill and stationary bike, and for the swimming portion of the race, she used the Advanced Resistive Exercise Device (ARED) to do weightlifting and resistance exercises that approximate swimming in microgravity. After swimming half a mile (0.8 km), biking 18 miles (29 km), and running 4 miles (6.4 km), Williams finished with a self-reported time of one hour, 48 minutes and 33 seconds.

She returned to Earth with fellow astronauts Yuri Malenchenko and Akihiko Hoshide on November 19, 2012. A procedural delay led the capsule to land in the town of Arkalyk, Kazakhstan, some 35 kilometres (22 mi) from the planned touchdown site.

=== Commercial Crew program ===
In July 2015, NASA announced Williams as one of the first astronauts for U.S. commercial spaceflights. She began working with Boeing and SpaceX to train in their commercial crew vehicles, along with other chosen astronauts. In August 2018, she was assigned to the first operational mission flight (Starliner-1) to the International Space Station of Boeing CST-100 Starliner. On April 18, 2022, NASA said the cadre of Starliner astronauts included Barry Wilmore, Michael Fincke, and Williams. On June 16, 2022, NASA said the Boeing Crew Flight Test (CFT) mission would be crewed by Wilmore and Williams.

The June 5, 2024, launch of Starliner made Williams, its pilot, the first woman to fly on a flight test of an orbital spacecraft. The mission was scheduled to last eight days, but problems with the Boeing's Starliner service module led NASA to leave Williams and Wilmore aboard the ISS for more than nine months. On March 18, 2025, both returned on SpaceX Crew-9 (Crew 9 was launched in September 2024, with two vacant seats to accommodate Williams and Wilmore's return). Before the mission, Williams was not among the top 50 astronauts as measured by time in space. On August 24, 2024, she became among the top 30 and is expected to be among the top 12 in time-in-space duration when she returns in 2025.

In September 2024, Williams took command of the ISS for the second time in her career. Williams handed over command of the space station to Roscosmos cosmonaut Aleksey Ovchinin during a ceremony on March 7, 2025.

=== Boeing Starliner incident and return to Earth ===
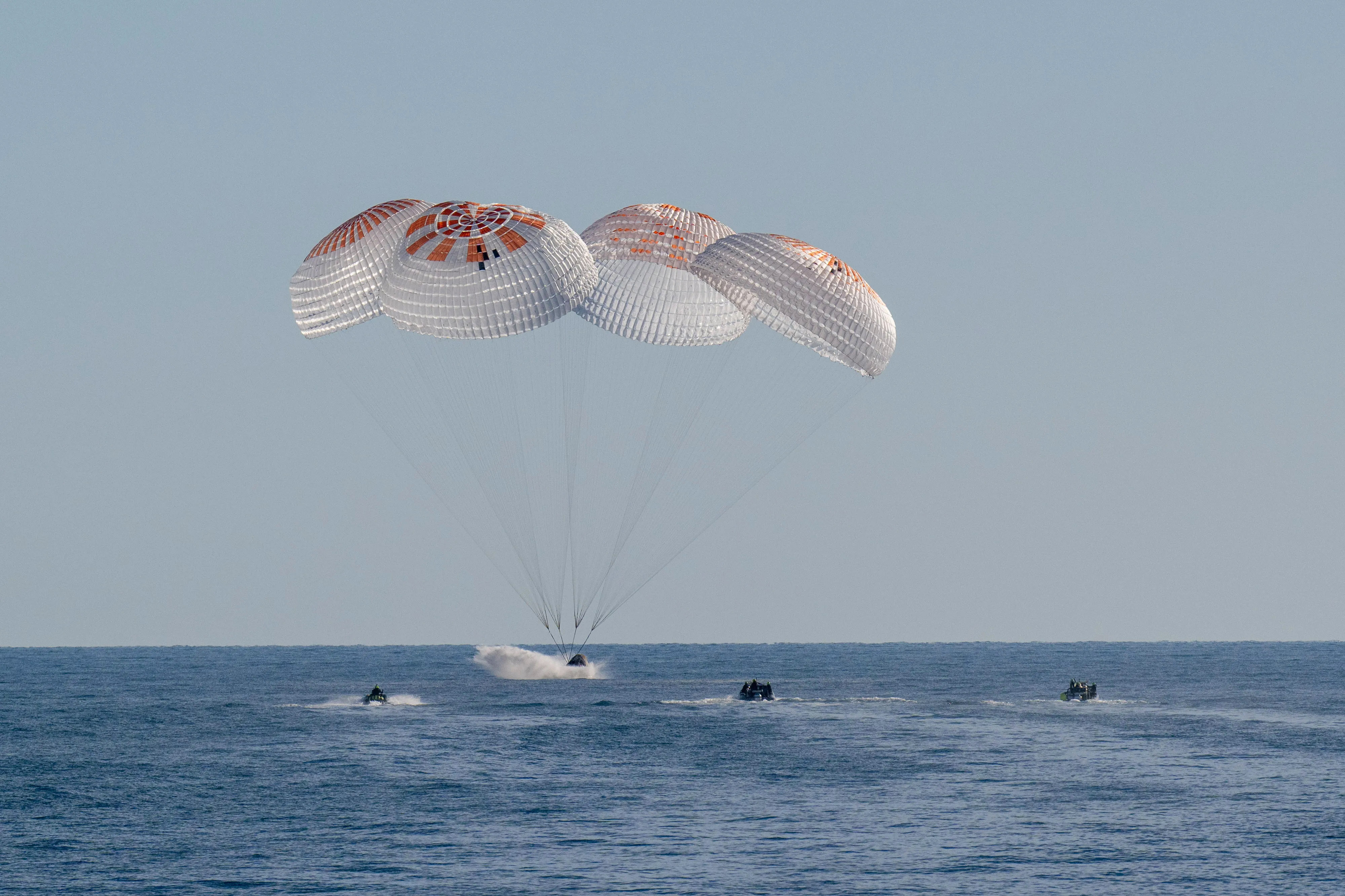
NASA astronauts - retired Navy Capts Suni Williams & Butch Wilmore, Space Force Col. Nick Hague - and Roscosmos cosmonaut Aleksandr Gorbunov land in a Dragon spacecraft off the coast of Tallahassee, FL., March 18, 2025.

In 2024, Sunita Williams returned to the ISS on the Boeing Crew Flight Test, the first crewed mission of the Boeing Starliner. The mission was supposed to last eight days, but technical problems such as helium leaks and propulsion system malfunctions stranded Williams and crewmate Butch Wilmore on the ISS for more than nine months. On March 18, 2025, she returned to Earth with Willmore and other crew members of SpaceX Crew-9, landing safely in the Gulf of Mexico near Tallahassee, Florida.

=== Spacewalks ===
As of January 2025, Williams had made nine spacewalks totaling 62 hours and 6 minutes, setting a total-time record for a woman and ranking fourth overall on the list of most experienced spacewalkers.

== Retirement from NASA ==
After a 27-year career with NASA, Sunita "Suni" Williams retired from the agency, effective December 27, 2025. Her retirement was officially announced by NASA on January 20, 2026. NASA Administrator Jared Isaacman described her as "a trailblazer in human spaceflight", noting that her contributions contributed to better space exploration and helped pave the way for future missions to the Moon and Mars.

Following the announcement of her retirement, Williams visited the Indian Institute of Technology Delhi on the same day to deliver a lecture titled The Making of an Astronaut: Sunita Williams' Story. During the visit, she spoke about her experiences in human spaceflight, including her recent missions during Expeditions 71 and 72, and interacted with students, faculty, and senior administrators of the institute. Talking about the current phase of human spaceflight, she remarked that "It is a very exciting time in human space exploration. Every new project has its ups and downs, but each one teaches us something and prepares us better for what comes next".

== Personal life ==
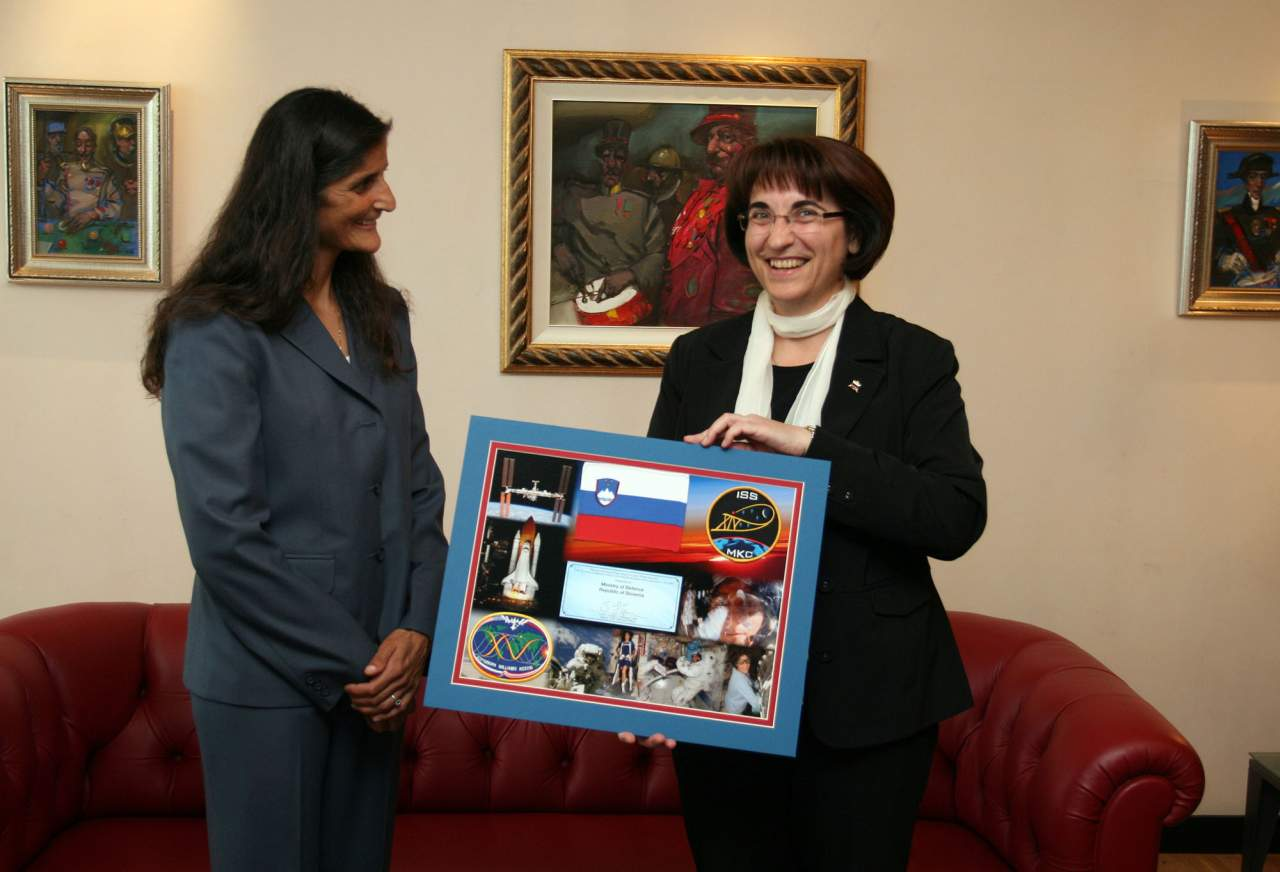
Williams with Slovenian Defense Minister Ljubica Jelušič (2009)

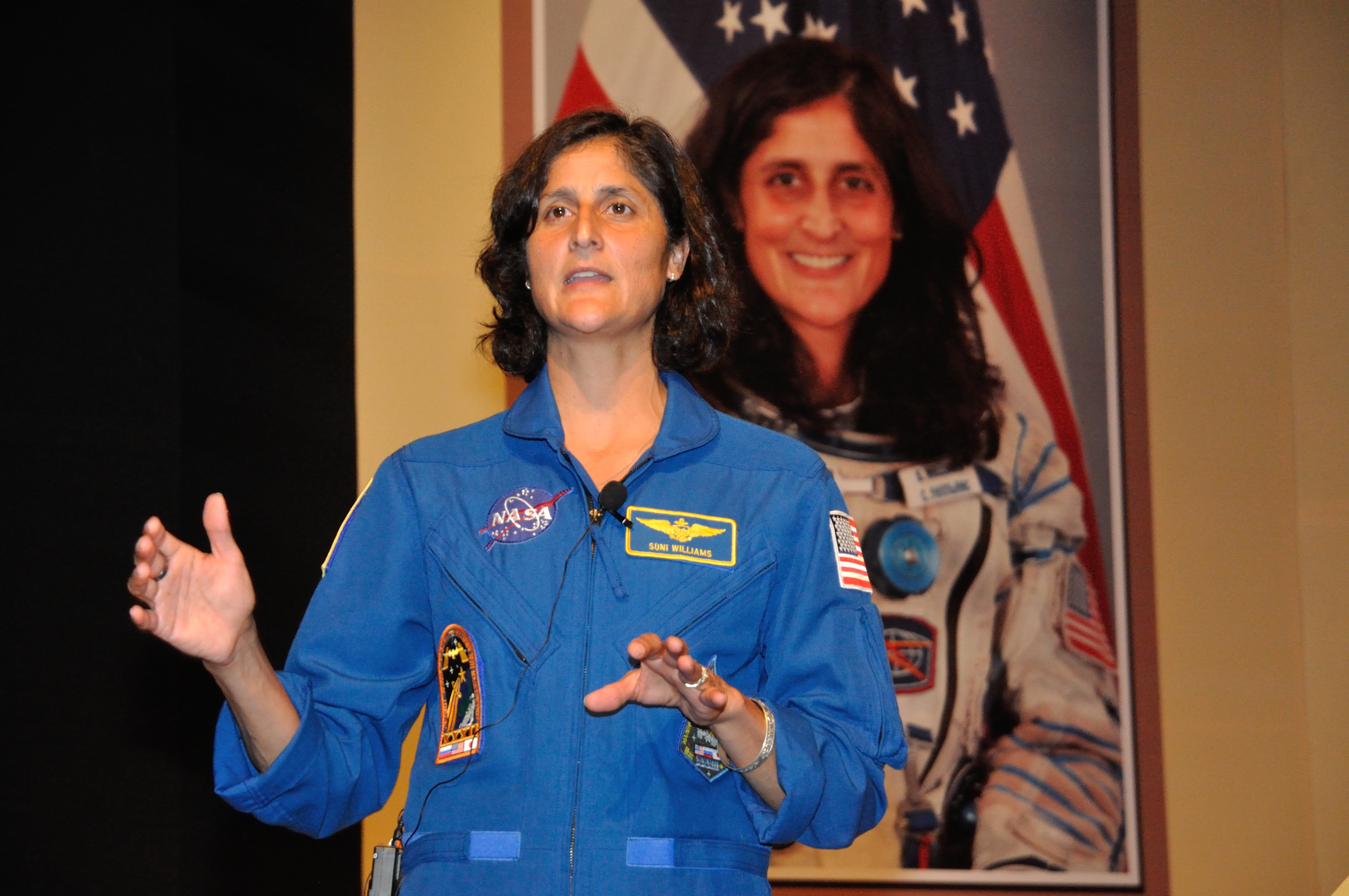
Williams at Science City Kolkata in April 2013

Williams has been married to Michael J. Williams, a federal marshal in Texas, for more than 20 years, and both flew helicopters early in their careers. They reside in suburban Houston, Texas. She had a pet Jack Russell terrier named Gorby who was featured with her on the Dog Whisperer television show on the National Geographic Channel on November 12, 2010. In 2012, Williams expressed a desire to adopt a girl from Ahmedabad.

Williams practices Hinduism. In December 2006, she took a copy of the Bhagavad Gita to the International Space Station; in July 2012, she took an Om symbol and a copy of the Upanishads. In September 2007, Williams visited the Sabarmati Ashram and her ancestral village of Jhulasan. She was awarded the Sardar Vallabhbhai Patel Vishwa Pratibha Award by the World Gujarati Society, the first person of Indian descent who was not an Indian citizen to be presented the award. On October 4, 2007, Williams spoke at the American Embassy School, and then met Manmohan Singh, the then Prime Minister of India.

Williams has also visited Slovenia several times. In 2009, the club Slovenian Astronaut (Slovenski astronavt) arranged a memorial room for her in Leše, Tržič, northwestern Slovenia. Leše was the birthplace of her great-grandmother Marija Bohinjec, born in 1891, who immigrated to the United States as an 11-year-old in 1900 or 1901. In May 2013, the former President of Slovenia Borut Pahor awarded Williams a medal of merit for her contribution to the popularization of science and technology among the Slovenian youth. During her stay in October 2014 she paid a visit to the Astronomical Society Vega in Ljubljana. She visited Slovenia again in 2016 and 2026.

In June 2017, the Needham Public Schools committee voted to name the town's new elementary school after Williams. In May 2020, Williams addressed more than 500,000 Indian and other international students in the United States in a virtual interview organized by the Student Hub at the Embassy of India, Washington, D.C., during the COVID-19 pandemic of 2020.

== Organizations ==
Williams was a member of the Society of Experimental Test Pilots, the Society of Flight Test Engineers, and the American Helicopter Association.

== Honors and awards ==
- Defense Superior Service Medal
- Legion of Merit
- Navy Commendation Medal
- Navy and Marine Corps Achievement Medal
- NASA Spaceflight Medal
- Medal "For Merit in Space Exploration", Government of Russia (2011)
- Padma Bhushan, Government of India (2008)
- Honorary Doctorate, Gujarat Technological University (2013)
- Golden Order for Merits, Government of Slovenia (2013)
- Sardar Vallabhbhai Patel - Vishwa Pratibha Award
- In December 2024, Sunita Williams was included on the BBC's 100 Women list.

== See also ==
- List of Asian American astronauts
- List of women astronauts

== Notes ==
Preceded by Gennady Padalka	ISS Commander (Expedition 33); September 16 to November 18, 2012	Succeeded by Kevin Ford
Preceded by Oleg Kononenko	ISS Commander (Expedition 72); September 22, 2024, to March 7, 2025	Succeeded by Aleksey Ovchinin
