= Deepak Pandya =

Indian American neuroanatomist (1932–2020)

- Born: Deepak Narmadashankar Pandya; 6 December 1932; Jhulasan, then in Baroda State, India
- Died: 4 October 2020 (aged 87); Venice, Florida, US
- Education: B. J. Medical College, Ahmedabad; Gujarat University
- Occupation: Neuroanatomist
- Spouse: Ursuline Zalokar
- Children: 3, including Sunita

Deepak Narmadashankar Pandya (Note: Gujarati: Dīpaka Narmadāśaṅkara Paṇḍyā) (6 December 1932 – 4 October 2020) was an Indian American neuroanatomist who is best known for his contributions to the understanding of cortical and subcortical brain connectivity in the macaque using tract-tracing methods. He is the father of NASA astronaut Sunita Williams.

== Early life and career ==
Deepak Narmadashankar Pandya was born on 6 December 1932, in Jhulasan, then part of Baroda State, in India. He was orphaned and completed his I.S. in 1953 from Gujarat University. After obtaining his M.D. degree from Gujarat University in 1957 (and interning in V.S. Hospital in Junagadh till 1958), he went to the United States and did his internship and residency training in Medicine in Cleveland, Ohio.

In 1964, Pandya joined the Department of Anatomy at Case Western Reserve University, as a postdoctoral fellow. He moved to Boston in 1966 and joined the Aphasia Research Center at the Boston Veterans Administration Medical Center, and the Departments of Anatomy and Neurology at Boston University School of Medicine as an Assistant Professor. During his postdoctoral fellowship and subsequent period in Boston, Pandya focused his research investigations on cortico-cortical connections. In 1969 his laboratory moved to Boston City Hospital. During this time he was appointed a lecturer in Experimental Neuropathology at Harvard Medical School, and he participated in teaching the Neuroscience course at both schools. In 1973, Pandya joined the Veterans Administration Medical Center in Bedford, Massachusetts, as a staff internist. He practised clinical medicine while continuing his research studies and teaching, until his retirement in 1995. After this, Pandya moved his office to the Department of Anatomy & Neurobiology at Boston University School of Medicine.

== Contributions and research ==
Pandya, along with many colleagues, made significant contributions in the field of connectivity of cerebral cortex. Several postdoctoral and Ph.D. students received training under Pandya. His research works have been internationally recognised and he presented his work at conferences in North America and Europe. Prior to his death, he had continued his research studies on comparative brain architectonics in monkeys and humans, as well as connectional studies in monkeys.

== Personal life ==
He married Slovene American Ursuline Bonnie Zalokar, who resides in Falmouth, Massachusetts. They are the parents of NASA astronaut Sunita Williams. He is a relative of Haren Pandya.
