= Soyuz TMA-05M =

2012 Russian crewed spaceflight to the ISS

- Operator: Roscosmos
- COSPAR ID: 2012-037A
- SATCAT no.: 38671
- Mission duration: 126 days, 23 hours, 13 minutes, 17 seconds

Spacecraft properties
- Spacecraft type: Soyuz-TMA 11F747
- Manufacturer: Energia

Crew
- Crew size: 3
- Members: Yuri Malenchenko; Sunita Williams; Akihiko Hoshide
- Callsign: Agate

Start of mission
- Launch date: 15 July 2012, 02:40:03 UTC
- Rocket: Soyuz-FG
- Launch site: Baikonur 1/5

End of mission
- Landing date: 19 November 2012, 01:53:30 UTC

Orbital parameters
- Reference system: Geocentric
- Regime: Low Earth

Docking with ISS
- Docking port: Rassvet nadir
- Docking date: 17 July 2012; 04:51 UTC
- Undocking date: 18 November 2012; 22:26 UTC
- Time docked: 124d 17h 35m
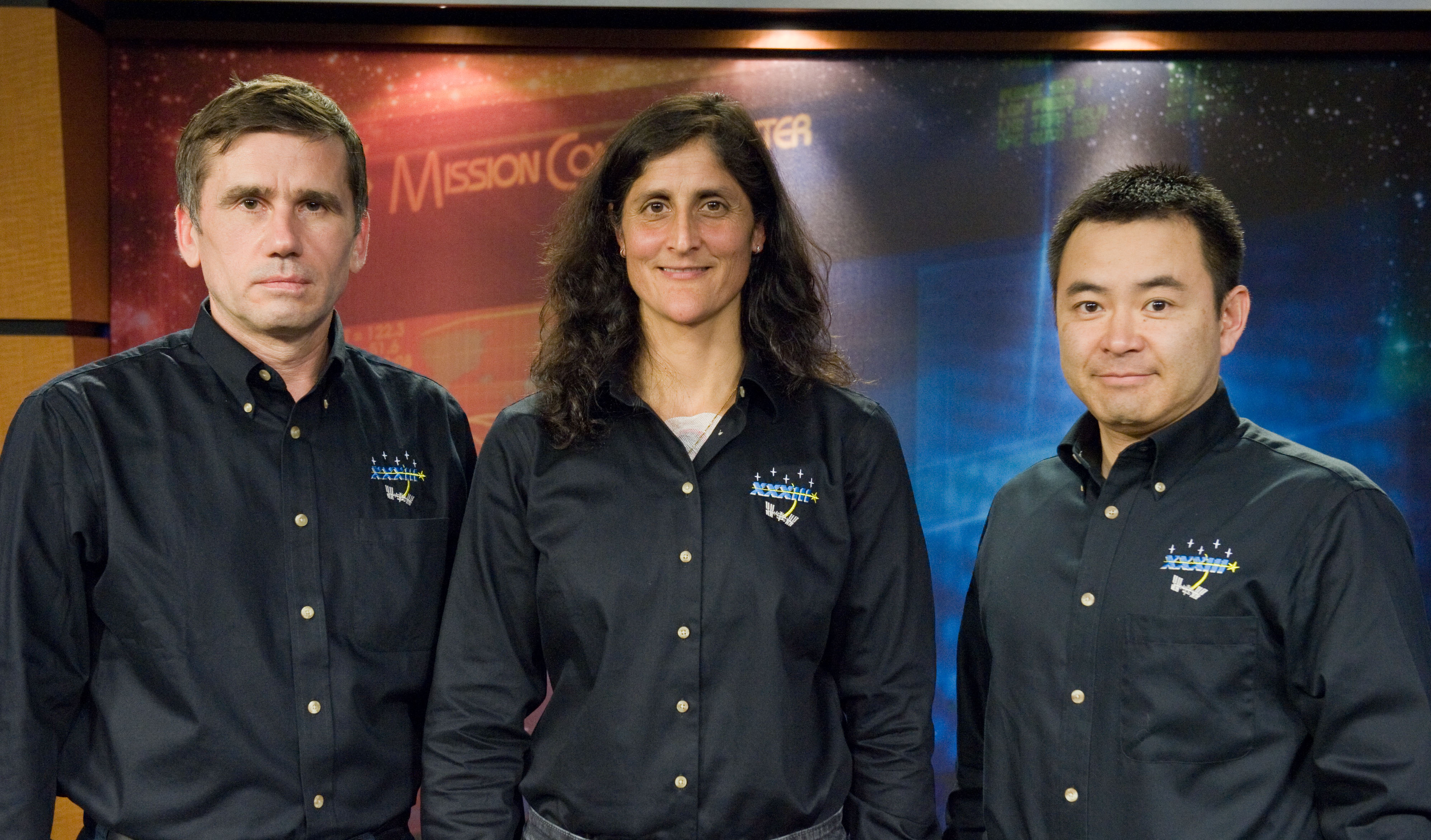
- (l-r) Malenchenko, Williams and Hoshide Soyuz programme (Crewed missions)

Soyuz TMA-05M was the 114th flight of a Soyuz spacecraft. It was launched on 15 July 2012, transporting three members of the Expedition 32 crew to the International Space Station (ISS). The Soyuz remained docked to the ISS throughout the mission to serve as an emergency escape vehicle. The launch also coincided with the 37th anniversary of the Apollo–Soyuz Test Project. Soyuz TMA-05M successfully returned to Earth on 19 November 2012.

== Crew ==
Position	Crew member
Commander	(Russia) Yuri Malenchenko, Roscosmos; Expedition 32; Fifth spaceflight
Flight Engineer 1	(United States) Sunita Williams, NASA; Expedition 32; Second spaceflight
Flight Engineer 2	(Japan) Akihiko Hoshide, JAXA; Expedition 32; Second spaceflight

=== Backup crew ===
Position	Crew Member
Commander	(Russia) Roman Romanenko, Roscosmos
Flight Engineer 1	(Canada) Chris Hadfield, CSA
Flight Engineer 2	(United States) Thomas Marshburn, NASA

== Launch ==
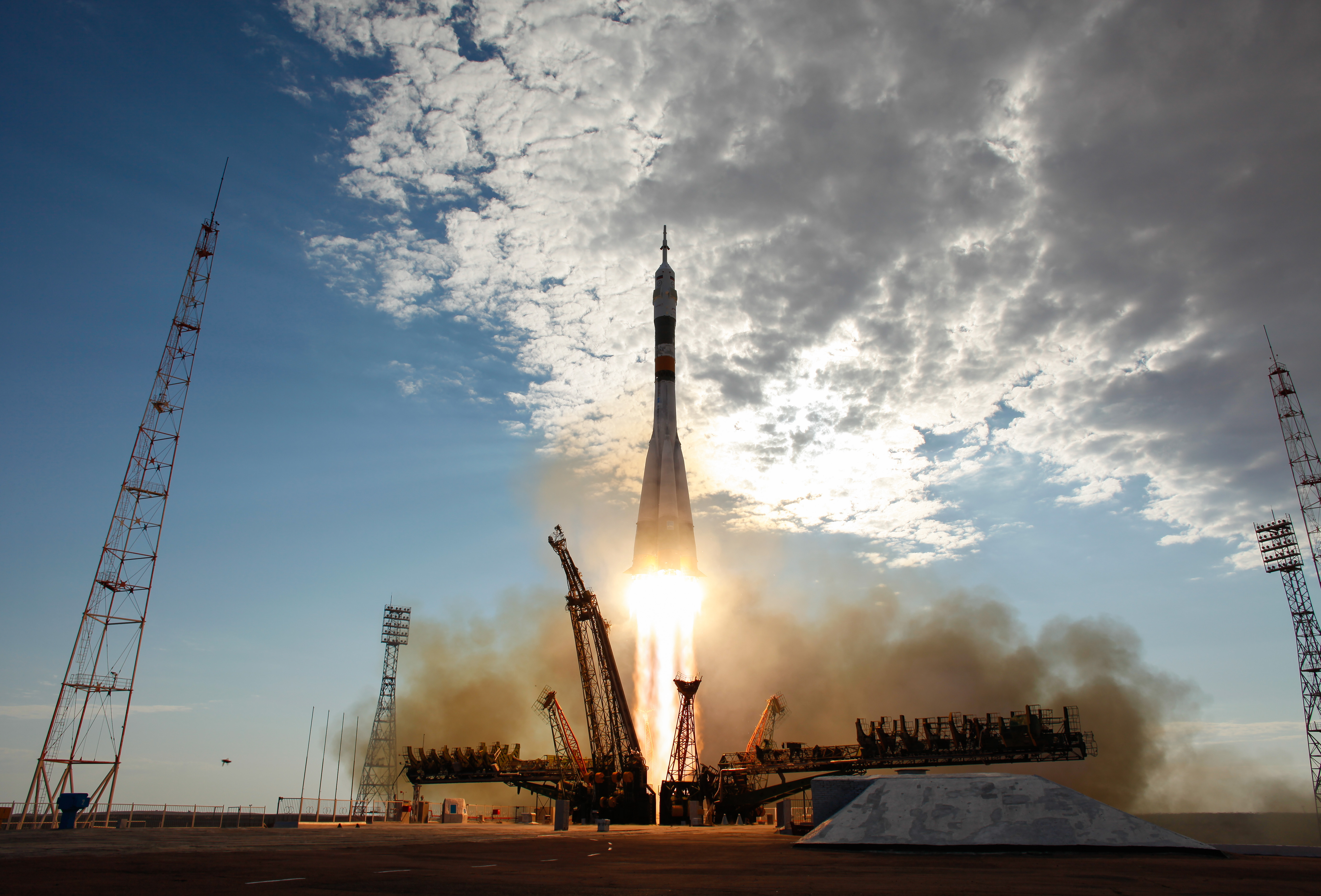
The Soyuz TMA-05M mission lifts-off to the ISS on 15 July 2012.

Soyuz TMA-05M was launched atop of a Soyuz FG rocket at 2:40 GMT on July 15, 2012 from the Baikonur Cosmodrome, Kazakhstan. Following the flawless launch, the Soyuz spacecraft successfully achieved orbital insertion 9 minutes later and began its 34-orbit journey to the Space Station.

== Docking ==
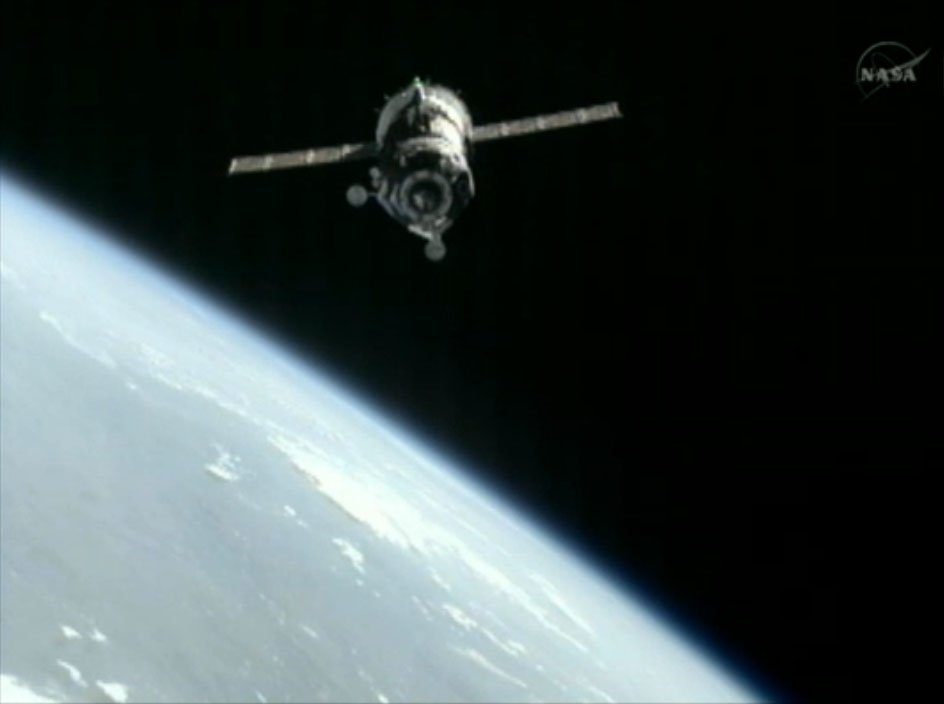
The spacecraft shortly before docking with the ISS on 17 July 2012.

As part of its phasing maneuvers to catch up with the ISS, 3.5 and 4.5 hours into the mission, the Soyuz Spacecraft performed two large SKD Main Propulsion System Burns changing the vehicle's speed by 41.5 m/s and 23.9 m/s, respectively. These burns were followed by a minor maneuver on July 16 for a velocity change of two m/s. The on time automated docking sequence began at 2:31 GMT on July 17, 2012.

The Crew activated the KURS Navigation System that provides accurate range and velocity data for the spacecraft's on-board computers. The station crew of Padalka, Revin and Acaba got up early changing their sleep cycles to support the rendezvous and docking operations of the Soyuz. Although the rendezvous and docking sequence is fully automated, cosmonaut Malenchenko and Russian mission controllers in Korolev, Moscow monitored the systems as well. As Soyuz TMA-05M approached the ISS, the spacecraft completed a series of trajectory correction maneuvers. At a range of 8 Kilometers to the space station, the Soyuz activated its TV system needed for automated operation monitoring. At a distance of 300 meters to the space station, Russian flight controllers issued a "GO" for the Flyaround to align Soyuz TMA-05M with the docking port on the Rassvet Module.

With the Flyaround completed, a short period of Stationkeeping was initiated at a range of 190 meters. The opportunity gave the flight controllers a chance to check the Soyuz systems and the alignment with the docking port. The crew was given a "GO" and the final approach commenced at 4:40 GMT.

Soyuz TMA-05M completed a successful docking at 4:51 GMT while the space station was flying high above North-East Kazakhstan: one minute earlier than planned. Shortly after, the docking probe was retracted and hooks started closing to establish the hard mate. The hard mate was followed by the standard one-hour leak check operations. After leak checks were completed, the crew opened the hatches and floated into the ISS. The arrival of Malenchenko, Williams and Hoshide on board Soyuz TMA-05M restored the space station's crew to full strength at six.

== Return to Earth ==
Soyuz TMA-05M undocked from the ISS on 18 November 2012 at 10:26 PM (GMT), carrying Hoshide, Malenchenko and Williams, and landed safely at 1:53:30 AM (GMT) the following day. A source at Energia told the Novosti news agency that the location was 51°.05 N, 67°.16 E in Kazakhstan, about 4.7 km from the aim point. Confusion during the NASA TV broadcast of the event led to some, including NASA's own Media Services, recording the landing time incorrectly as 01:56. The spacecraft's departure marked the end of Expedition 33 and the start of Expedition 34.

== Gallery ==
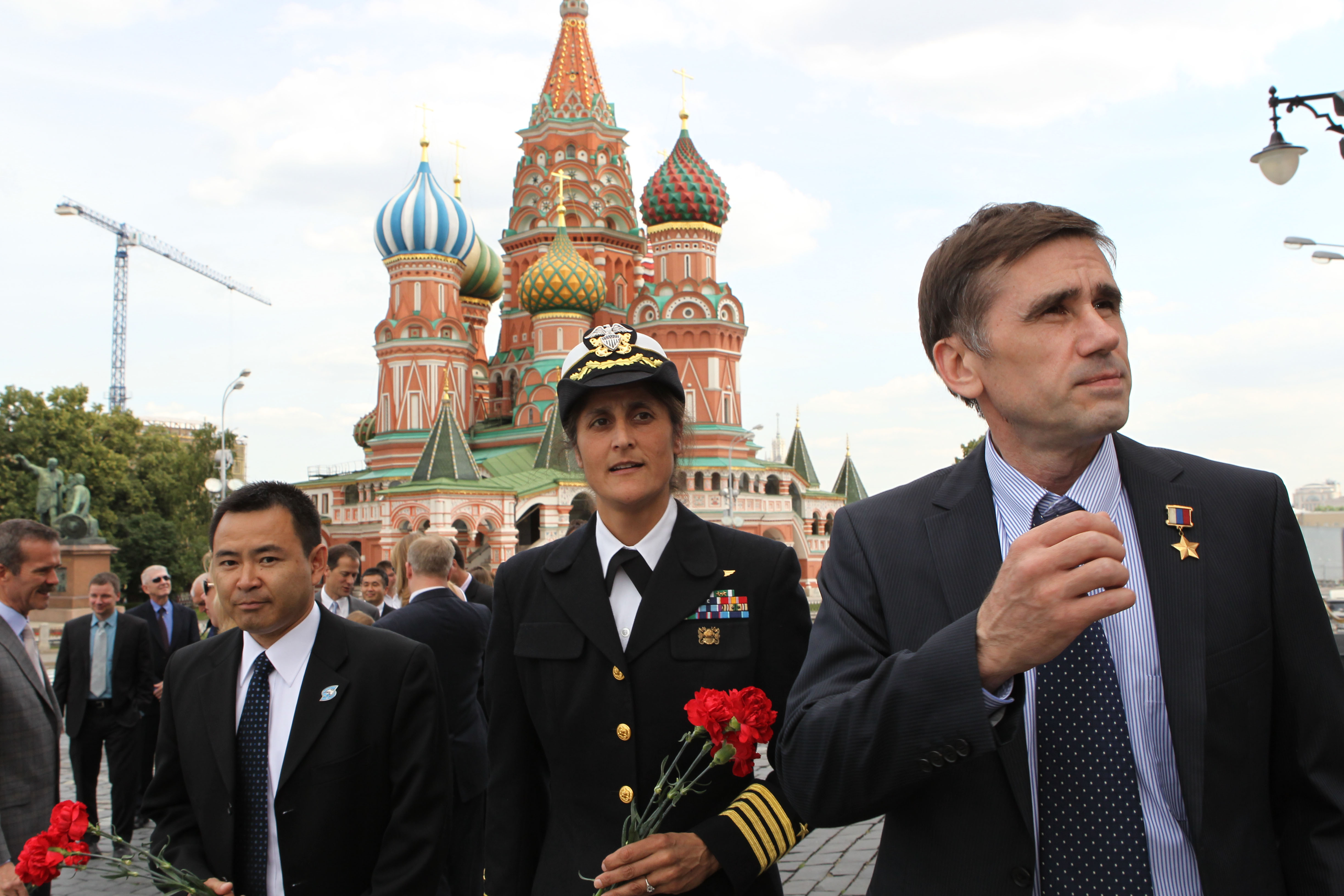
The Soyuz TMA-05M crew members conduct their ceremonial tour of Red Square on 22 June 2012.

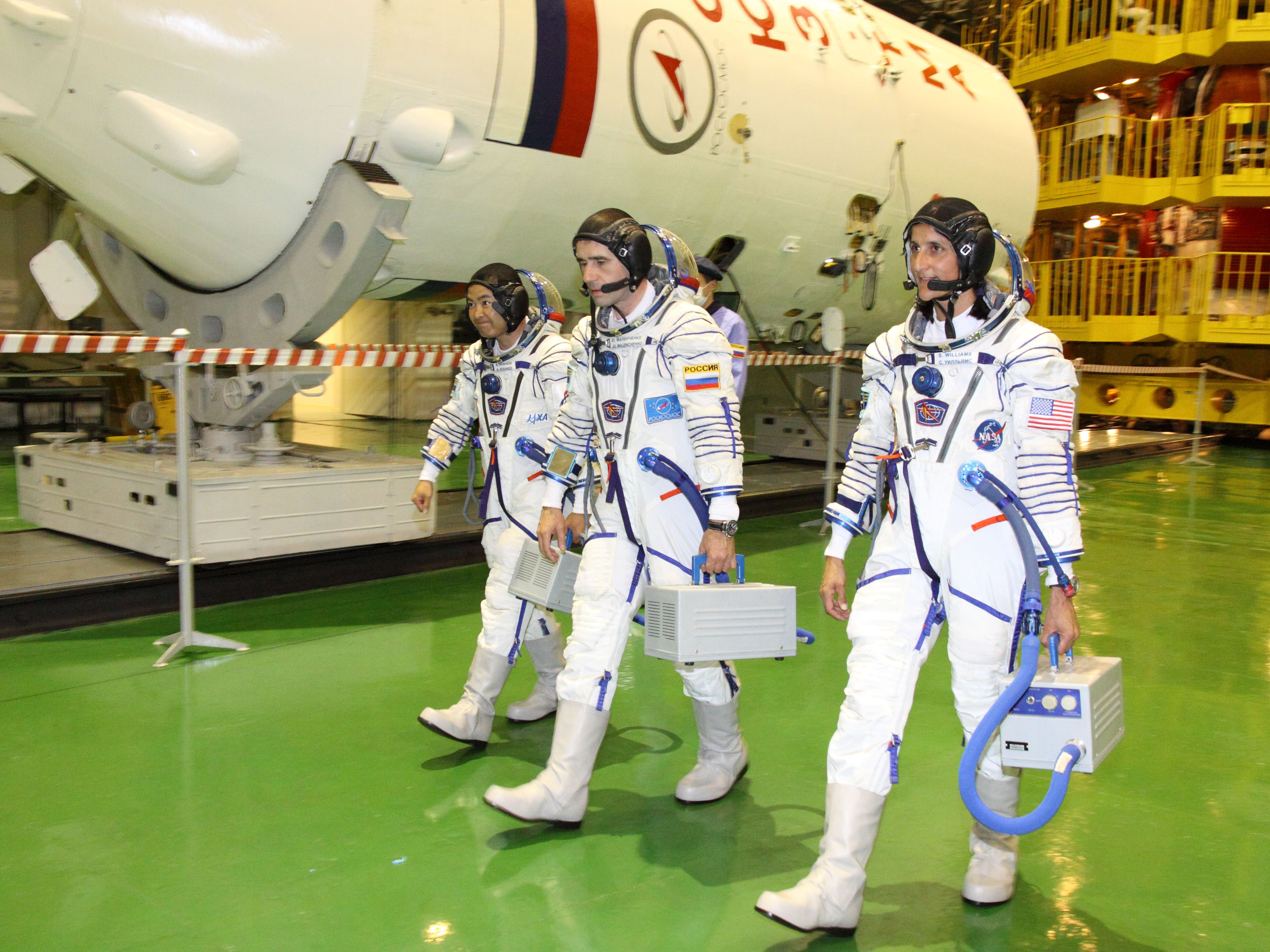
Crew members during a suited "fit check" of the Soyuz TMA-05M spacecraft at the Baikonur Cosmodrome.

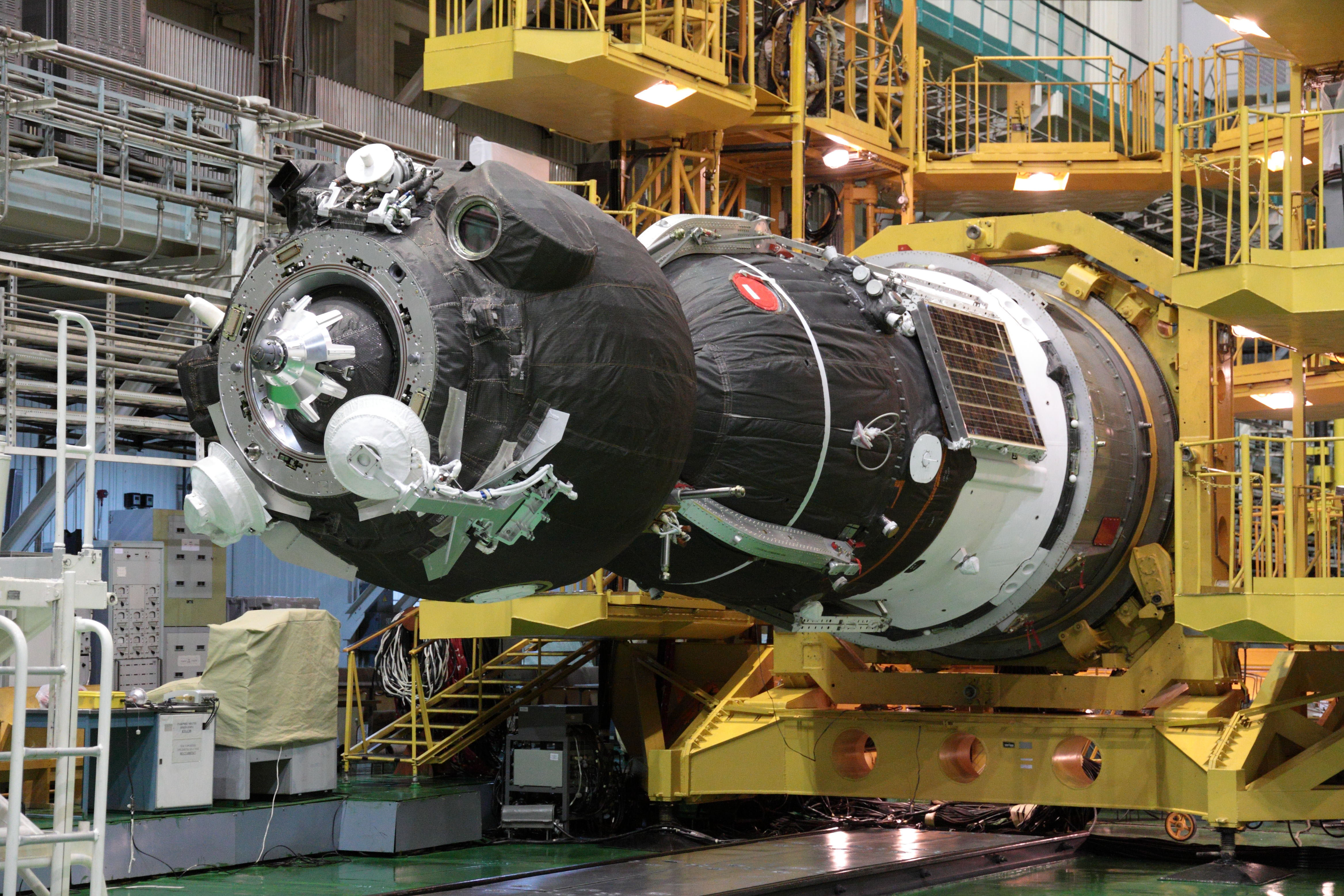
The spacecraft during pre-launch processing on 8 July 2012.

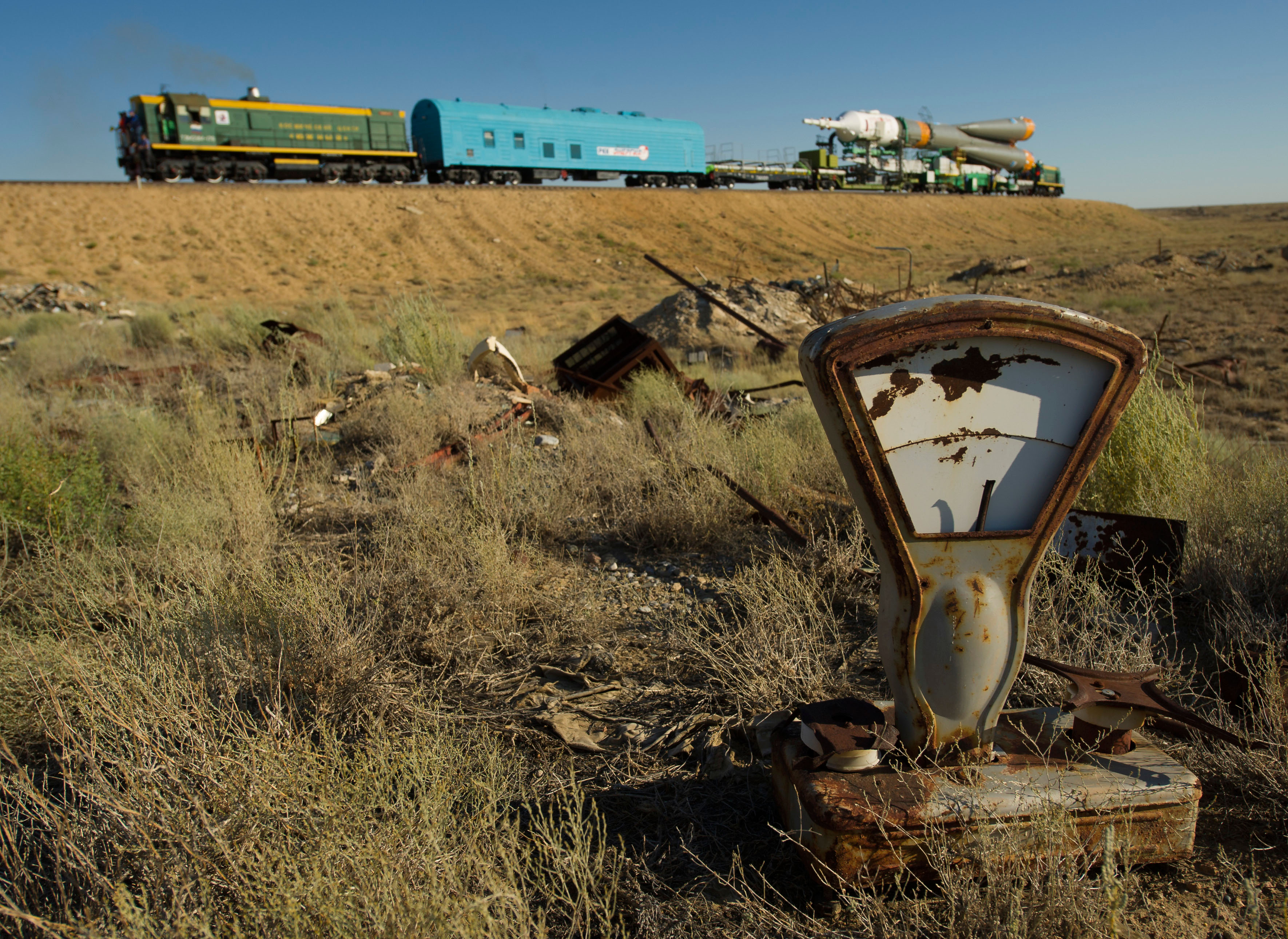
The spacecraft being transported to the launch site on 12 July 2012.

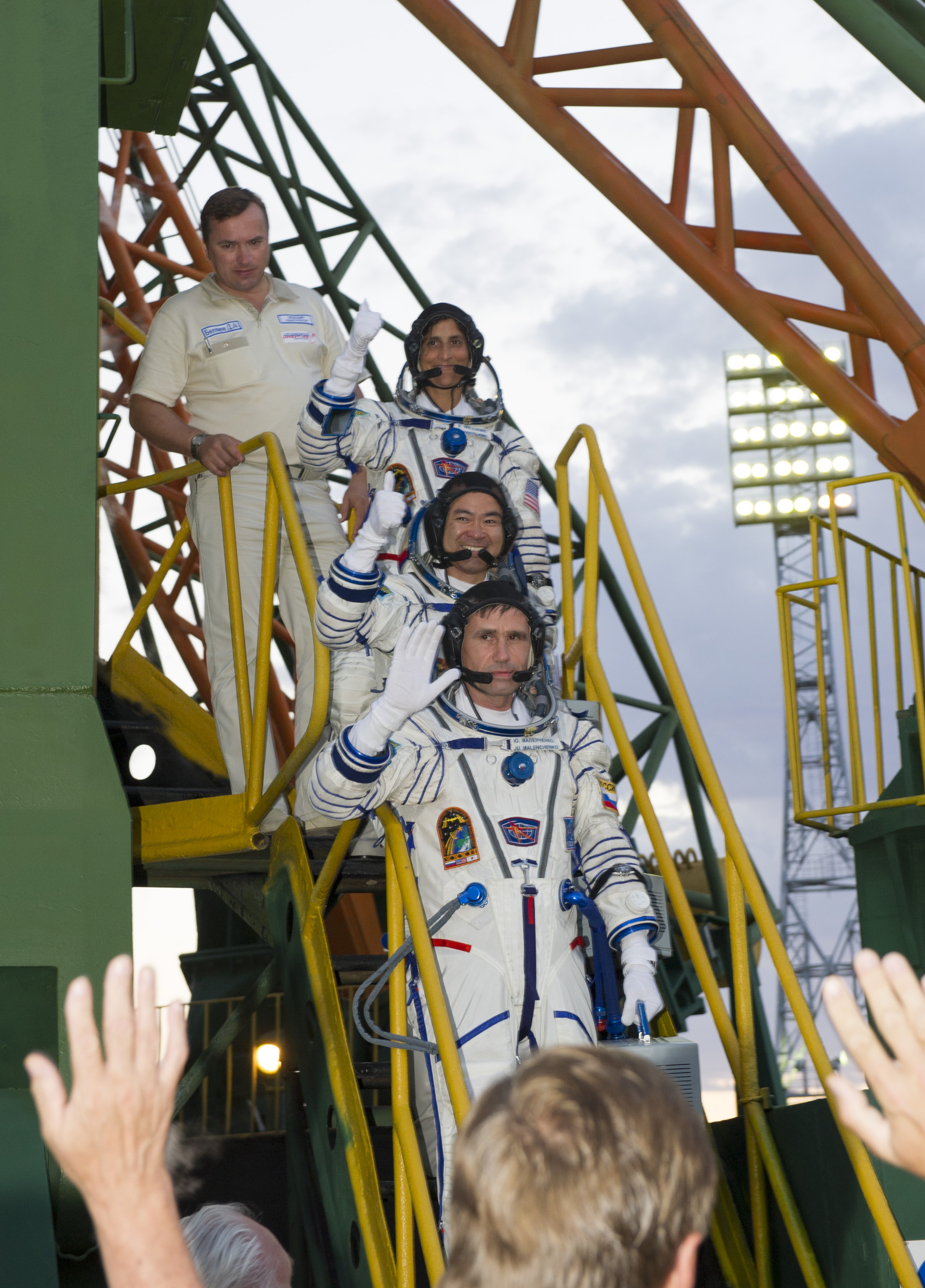
The TMA-05M crew wave to spectators before launch on 15 July 2012.
