= Pansar railway station =

Railway station in Gujarat, India

Pansar

General information
- Location: Pansar, Gandhinagar district, Gujarat; India
- Coordinates: 23°18′28″N 72°28′47″E
- Elevation: 75 metres (246 ft)
- System: Indian Railways station
- Owner: Indian Railways
- Operator: Western Railway
- Line: Ahmedabad–Jaipur line
- Platforms: 2
- Tracks: Double Electric-Line

Construction
- Structure type: Standard (on ground)

Other information
- Status: Functioning
- Station code: PN
- Zone(s): Western Railway zone
- Division(s): Ahmedabad

Services
Preceding station	Indian Railways	Following station
Jhulasan towards ?	Western Railway zone Ahmedabad–Jaipur line	Isand towards ?
Location
- Interactive map

Pansar railway station is a railway station in located on Ahmedabad–Jaipur railway line operated by the Western Railway under Ahmedabad railway division. It is situated at Pansar in Gandhinagar district in the Indian state of Gujarat.
