= Isand railway station =

Railway station in Gujarat, India

Isand

General information
- Location: Isand, Kalol Taluka, Gandhinagar district, Gujarat; India
- Coordinates: 23°17′39″N 72°29′06″E
- Elevation: 77 metres (253 ft)
- System: Indian Railways station
- Owner: Indian Railways
- Operator: Western Railway
- Line: Ahmedabad–Jaipur line
- Platforms: 1
- Tracks: Double Electric-Line

Construction
- Structure type: Standard (on ground)

Other information
- Status: Functioning
- Station code: EN
- Zone(s): Western Railway zone
- Division(s): Ahmedabad

Services
Preceding station	Indian Railways	Following station
Pansar towards ?	Western Railway zone Ahmedabad–Jaipur line	Kalol towards ?
Location
- Interactive map

Isand railway station is a railway station in located on Ahmedabad–Jaipur railway line operated by the Western Railway under Ahmedabad railway division. It is situated at Isand, Kalol Taluka in Gandhinagar district in the Indian state of Gujarat.
