= Jhulasan =

Jhulasan(ઝુલાસણ)
- village
- Interactive map of Jhulasan(ઝુલાસણ)
- Country: India
- State: Gujarat
- District: Mehsana

Government
  - Type: Indian

Population (2010)
  - Total: 5,000

Languages
  - Official: Gujarati, Hindi
- Time zone: UTC+5:30 (IST)
- PIN: 382705
- Vehicle registration: GJ-02
- Nearest city: Kalol, Ahmedabad
- Website: gujaratindia.com

Jhulasan (Gujarati: ઝુલાસણ Jhulāsaṇ) is a village located in district of Mehsana, Kadi Taluka in the state of Gujarat, India.

== Name ==
According to Hasmukh Dhirajlal Sankalia, the name Jhulāsaṇ may be identical to the Kūlāvasaṇa mentioned in medieval epigraphy. Assuming this is the case, then the name is ultimately derived from Sanskrit vasaṇa, meaning "dwelling" or "residence" (of either an individual or a group). There is another belief that some travelers were going from one place to another and decided to rest at this place and made Jula, (swing hanging from the branch of a tree) and liked the place and decided to settle down so they gave the name of this place Jhulasan.

== Demographics ==
It has a population of about 5,000. The majority of the residents are farmers. More than 2500 people from Jhulasan have migrated to the USA and Canada. Other families have migrated to the nearby cities of Kalol, Ahmedabad, and Gandhinagar.

American astronaut Sunita Williams (Pandya)' father, Deepakbhai Pandya, a doctor in Boston, migrated to the USA in the early 1960s.

== Transport ==
Jhulasan railway station is the nearest railway station situated on Ahmedabad–Jaipur railway line.

== Background ==
Jhulasan is one of the most developed villages in Kadi Taluka, district Mehsana of Gujarat state, in India. The majority of the population in this village are Patels. Thakor, Prajapati, Raval, Rabari, Gajjars, Suthars, Barots, and Ravals are minorities. About 350 families, have migrated to USA and Canada.

== Temples ==
There are many large temples in this village. The Dola Mata (goddess) temple is the biggest one and is worldwide popular. There is a Swaminarayan Temple (Under Nar Narayan Dev Gadi), Radha Vallabh Temple (Radhe Radhe), Ramji Mandir, Sat Kaival Ashram, Gogleshvar Mahadev, Nilkantheswar Mahadev Temple (Mahadev Vas) with Shitla Mata and Hanuman Temple, Pipaleshavar Mahadev Temple, Narayan Mahadev Temple, Varahi Mata Temple, Vihat Mata Temple and few other temples.

== Education ==
- Jhulasan Anupam Prathmik Shala
- Jhulasan Prathmik School
- C. P. Gajjar High School
- 2. Construction of the New Building for Jhulasan Anupam Primary School Following the reconstruction of the Varahi Mata Temple, an initiative was undertaken to replace the old building of the Jhulasan Anupam Primary School with a new facility equipped with modern amenities and technology. The new school building was constructed with the objective of providing students with smart, technology-based education. School Name: Patel Kusumben Bharatbhai Bhaktidas Dr. Parivar Anupam Primary School (Managed by the Mehsana District Education Committee). Inauguration Date: February 12, 2025. Cost and Support: Constructed at a cost of approximately ₹6 crore, with financial contributions from over 200 local and NRI donors. Modern Amenities: The new building features 18 classrooms, 2 computer rooms, a smart classroom, and a playground. Significant contributions to this project were made by US-based philanthropists Bharatbhai Manilal Patel and Kanubhai Joitaram Patel (Bhagat), along with other NRI residents from the village. Additionally, village leaders Dr. Bhikhabhai Patel, Rajubhai Choksi, and other prominent citizens provided their support for this endeavor.
- reliable source (1)https://www.divyabhaskar.co.in/local/gujarat/mehsana/kadi/news/inauguration-of-a-modern-school-worth-6-crore-in-kadina-jhulasan-134461761.html (2)https://cmogujarat.gov.in/en/news-clip/kadi-jhulasan-anupam-primary-school-inauguration-news
