= Indian students abroad =

The most prominent destination for international students from India is primarily the Anglosphere with close to one million Indian students, followed more distantly by the Europe, the West Asia and the Far East.

The number of Indian students studying outside India rapidly increased by 163% between 1999 and 2006 to reach 145,539 as compared to slower growth of 25% between 2006 and 2013 to reach 181,872, according to an analysis of UNESCO data. As of January 2021, more than 1 million Indian students are studying in 85 countries outside India. More than 50% of Indian students study in North America.

Note: This article does not take into account people of Indian origin or ancestry who are not Indian nationals.

== Statistics ==
These are the top study destinations for Indian students, based on number of active students:

Top Countries for Indian Students
Country	Number of Indian Students	Year	Application Fee (2024)
Canada	137,608	2025	CAD 150
United States	331,602	2025	$185
Australia	118,109	2024	AUD 1600
United Kingdom	92,355	2025	£524
Germany	49,008	2024	€75
New Zealand	22,225	2025	NZD 375
Russia	23,000	2025	
China	23,198	2023	¥750
Singapore	17,000+	2023	$90

Indian currency rates are not accounted for here as exchange rates keep fluctuating.

== Anglosphere ==
=== Australia ===
As of July 2024, there are 118,109 Indian students in Australia.

After peaking in 2009, the number of Indian students studying in Australia fell following violent attacks against Indians in Australia. By 2015, the number had risen to exceed the 2009 number. During 2013–14, 34,100 Australian visas were issued to Indian students, a rise of 38% as compared to the previous period. There were 115,000 Indian students present in Australia in 2020, and 77,000 Indian students present in Australia in 2021. According to data furnished in India's Rajya Sabha in 2021, the number of Indian students registered in Australia was as high as 92,383. In the second half of 2022, India overtook China as the number one country lodging student visa applications in Australia.

Due to border closure starting the second half of 2020, the number of new Indian students studying in Australia declined by 83% At least 12,740 Indian nationals holding Australian student visas were stuck outside Australia as of January 2021. In March 2021, Indian students and other temporary visa holders staged protests in Delhi and Chandigarh, objecting to Australia's uncompromising approach that kept them out of the country for a year despite the COVID-19 cases in India being relatively low at the time. Unhappy with the country's lack of support to international students, enrolled students took to social media to warn others against studying in Australia. Some Indian students made the switch to Canada owing to its friendlier approach towards international students.

There have been calls for fast-tracking permanent residency for onshore Australian residents from India, with stress on creating smoother pathways to migration for international students.

==== Ban on students from Punjab, Haryana, Uttarakhand, Uttar Pradesh, and Jammu & Kashmir ====
In the first half of 2023, reports emerged that students from Punjab and Haryana were banned or restricted from applying to five Australian universities. The universities feared their ability to fast-track applications would be compromised by Home Affairs due to the number of applicants from these states intending to actually work, and not study. In 2020–21, at least 600 student applications with forged documents from these states surfaced to light.

In mid-2023, Australian universities expanded the bans to include Uttarakhand, Uttar Pradesh, and Jammu & Kashmir. In 2025, several Australian universities revised their restricted regions list in response to a significant rise in student visa misuse by individuals seeking migration opportunities rather than pursuing genuine education. Among the Indian states included were Punjab, Haryana, Uttar Pradesh, Rajasthan, Gujarat, and Jammu and Kashmir.

=== Canada ===
As of 2025, there were 137,608 international students from India enrolled in Canadian institutions.

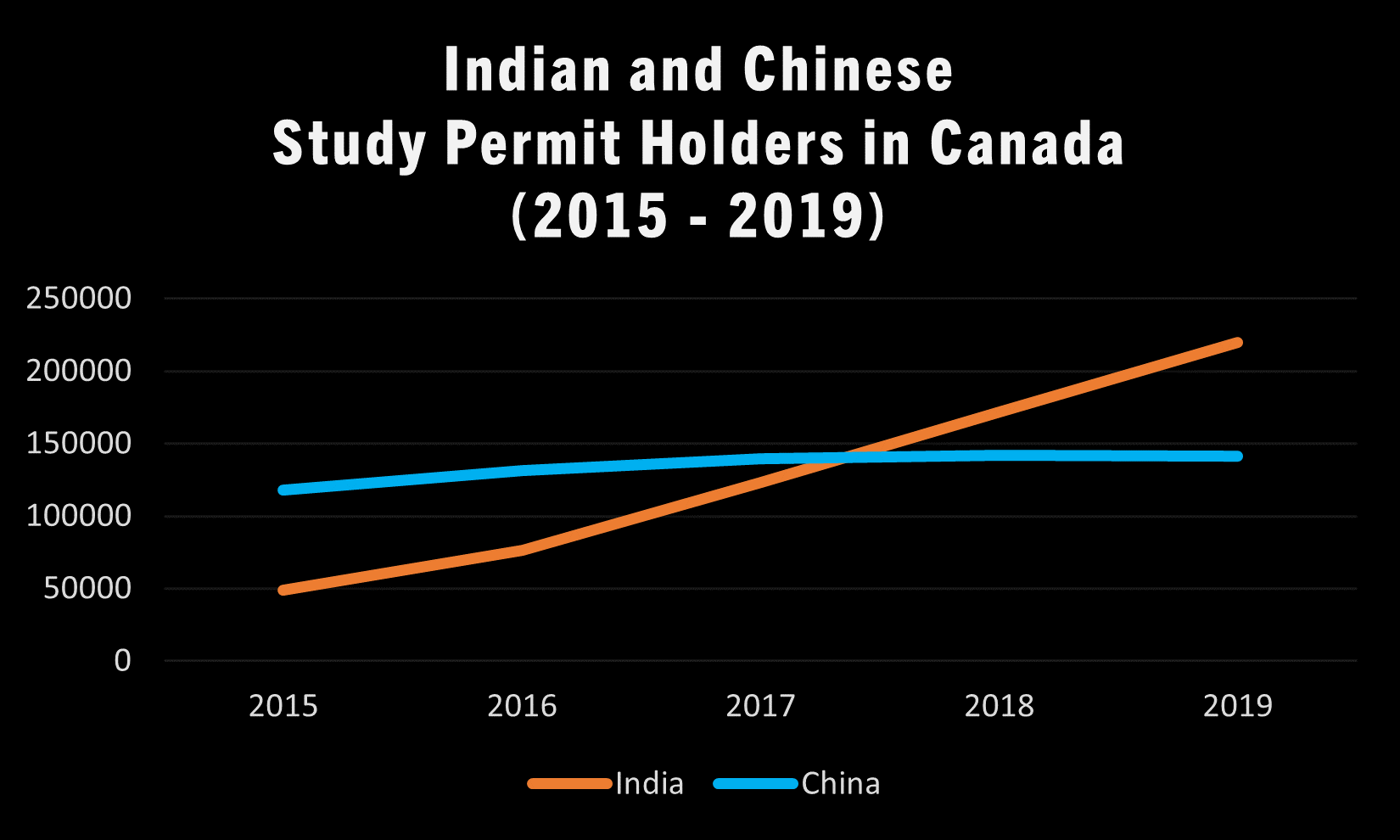
Indians have been the dominant student group in Canada since 2018.

==== Historical trends ====
The number of Indian students in Canada exceeded the number of Chinese students in Canada in 2018, with the Indian student population quadrupling between 2015 and 2019. The number of Indian students in Canada increased from 48,765 in 2015 to 219,855 in 2019, constituting 34% of Canada's foreign student population.

==== Impact of the Covid-19 pandemic ====
Canada placed a travel ban on India and Pakistan starting April 22, 2021, because of the COVID-19 pandemic. With the ban being extended further, Indian students from Punjab reportedly travelled to Canada through Moscow, Mexico, Serbia, Qatar, Dubai among other locations, paying up to three times the regular air fare. Canada also does not accept RT-PCR tests from Indian labs because of which students travelling from India are forced to get tested elsewhere before entering Canada.

University of Ottawa professor Amir Attaran slammed Canada PM Justin Trudeau's decision to ban flights from India as racist, pointing out that the United Kingdom experienced 6500% higher cases than Canada in the same time period but did not face a similar travel ban to Canada.

==== Student Visas and Migration ====
Canada is a preferred destination for Indian nationals due to multi-year Post-Graduation Work Permit (PGWP) offered indiscriminately for strengthening the underfunded Canadian education system. Provisions were also available until recently for an easier transition to permanent residency in Canada, and the strong diasporic presence of the community in certain provincial areas offered additional benefits. Also, international students do not need to pay tuition in advance or deposit money in Canada to show that they are able to stay and live in Canada without being a burden when applying for a study permit. Policy experts suggest that Indian students intending to go to the US are instead moving to Canada due to the former’s lack of accessible permanent residency pathways and the limited H-1B visa prospects available from India for achieving their ambition to settle in North America. The decisions of Australia and New Zealand to close borders to international students in 2021 also contributed to the surge in Indian student migration to Canada.

According to student reports from India, study permit refusal rates to Canada were as high as 60% during the Fall 2021 semester. The primary reason for the majority of study permit refusals was poor IELTS scores and academic plans that did not match the students’ profiles. Study permit rejection rates remained as high as 50% in 2022, mostly driven by young Punjabi applicants.

==== Deportation of Punjab-based students ====
Around 700 students from Punjab faced deportation from Canada early in 2023 after it came to light that their education offer letters were fake. Chandigarh University offered to help out students facing deportation by offering them admission in the same batches, and by using credit score mapping to transfer their course units. Previously, Indian international students bought IELTS certificates and applied for admissions, which resulted in higher number of international students pursuing their studies in Canada without the needed English proficiency to be functional in Canada. The Canadian government also offered a reprieve. In June, Canada's immigration minister Sean Fraser said genuine students who are victims of fraud would be allowed to stay after an investigation.

=== New Zealand ===
There were 22,225 Indian students enrolled in New Zealand, as of 2015.

A 26% student visa refusal rate was reported for Indian students applying to study in New Zealand between July 2019 and February 2020.

=== United Kingdom ===
There are 92,355 Indian nationals on study visas in the UK, as of 2025.

The number of Indians granted study visas grew by 307% between 2019 and 2022, increasing from 34,261 to 139,539. India also displaced China as the most common nationality granted UK study visas, with the East Asian country recording 102,842 such nationals in 2022. Together, Indian and Chinese nationals comprise half of all study visa grants in the UK.

In 2021, a two-year post-study work visa for international students was officially instated.

=== United States of America ===
331,602 Indian students were recorded in the United States as of 2025.

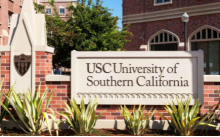
Indian students added USD 7.6 billion to the US economy during the 2019-20 academic year.

Indian students pumped US$7.6 billion into the US economy during the 2019-20 period.

==== Historical trends ====
In 2010, the number of Indian students studying in the US crossed 100,000. According to the 2017 report, the number of Indian students in the USA numbered 186,000. In 2019, Indian students opting for the US declined by 4%. At least 207,000 international Indian students were recorded to be present in the United States in 2020. As of 2022, India has surpassed China to become the top country with most international students in the United States.

==== Impact of educational programs ====
Students seeking international education are profoundly impacted by the programs they select and the less academically and pedagogically proficient departments that deliver them. These factors shape not only their academic trajectories but also their professional and financial prospects. Many international students from India perceive a U.S. degree as a gateway to work visas and enhanced job opportunities, often using it to navigate the absence of clear, legally accessible pathways to achieve their U.S. aspirations. However, the financial burden of pursuing these degrees, coupled with uncertainties in securing employment in labor markets characterized by less proficient knowledge, skills, and refined abilities, poses significant challenges. High tuition costs, combined with a low return on investment, can leave students in considerable debt, particularly when academic programs lack strong faculty expertise or resources. Furthermore, cultural differences and limited assimilation into U.S. norms—beginning with culturally aligned classroom behaviors and expectations—highlight potential challenges and frictions that international students might introduce to organizations operating under U.S.-centric standards. These factors underscore the difficulties international students face in achieving their goals, emphasizing the need for both government and educational institutions to proactively address these issues.

==== Impact of the Covid-19 pandemic ====
Enrolment in the 2020 Fall Semester dropped by 43% following the COVID-19 pandemic. In July 2020, the American administration announced that international university students may have to leave the United States if their studies moved completely online, putting the future of tens of thousands of students in jeopardy. First-time student visa applicants expressed their concerns about shut embassies and limited staff availability, with many postponing their study plans. In May 2021, certain categories of Indian students were exempted from US travel restrictions.

==== Student Visas and Migration ====
The country-cap on Green Cards has been widely criticized for perpetuating an arbitrary immigration system that has seen little meaningful reform since the 1960s. Despite being the birthplace of Silicon Valley, the United States continues to rely on a paper-based system rather than adopting a modern, digital, and computerized system suited for the 21st century. Indian-American advocacy groups have criticized the outdated frameworks and systems, especially in comparison to those of countries like Canada, Australia, New Zealand, and Japan, arguing that it leaves qualified Indian professionals in the U.S. waiting decades to obtain permanent residency, despite their significant contributions to the economy and society. They say that the current exploitative visa schemes coupled with the systemic inefficiency is one which forces immigrants to "engage in a life of indentured servitude," reflecting the thirteenth amendment. For many Indian students, the prospect of securing permanent residency through legal recognition of their contributions is a key motivator for studying in the U.S. However, the lack of such opportunities, combined with a system that only favors illegal immigrants, has been reflected in shifting admission trends, with more students choosing Canada over the U.S. The U.S. lawmakers have expressed their disapproval of the U.S. immigration system that has driven international students, particularly those from India, north to Canada.

== Europe ==
=== France ===
As of 2019, there were 10,000 Indian students in France. The country aims to attract 20,000 Indian students by 2025.

In July 2021, France announced that fully vaccinated Indian students, among other Indian nationals, can travel to France without restriction.

=== Germany ===
There are 33,753 Indian students present in Germany, as of 2022.

During the 2014-15 period, Indian students studying in Germany constituted 4.9% of international students in the country. By 2019, the number of Indian students in Germany increased to 25,149.

=== Russia ===
As of 2021, at least 16,500 Indian students were registered in Russian these, out of which 6,000 students are pursuing research and higher. Medical education in Russia is subsidized for international students but in 2024 and 2025 many of them were expelled and they all returned to india.

=== Ukraine ===
At least 20,000 Indian students were studying in various medical colleges in Ukraine in 2021.

As of March 2022, 18,000 Indians living in Ukraine, mostly students, were evacuated from Romania, Poland, Hungary, Slovakia and Moldova as part of Operation Ganga. One Indian student was killed by shelling in Kharkiv. A student from Bogomolets National Medical University wrote an autobiography about his life in Ukraine and aftermath of the Invasion titled "The Life of Tolka"

== Euro-Asian (Eurasian) ==
=== Georgia ===
In recent years, Georgia, a Eurasian nation located at the intersection of Eastern Europe and Western Asia, has emerged as a popular destination for Indian students pursuing higher education abroad particularly in MBBS . Georgia's medical universities, many of which are recognized by the National Medical Commission (NMC) of India, attract a substantial number of Indian students every year.

As of 2025, it is estimated that over 20,000 Indian students are enrolled in Medical Universities in Georgia, primarily pursuing MBBS programs. The actual number of Indian students in Georgia across all fields of study—such as business, nursing, pharmacy, IT, and engineering—may be two to three times higher, reflecting Georgia’s growing popularity as a higher education hub for Indian nationals.

Georgia became a popular choice among Indian students for several reasons. The medical degrees offered by these institutions are globally recognized. The students hence have further scope to practice or pursue further studies in other countries. Most of the courses are taught in English, making it easier for Indian students to understand. On top of that, the tuition fees and living expenses are quite affordable compared to countries like the US or UK. Getting a student visa is also a smooth process, which makes things less stressful. Plus, with a growing Indian student community and a culture that feels familiar, students quickly feel comfortable and at home in Georgia.

==== Medical Universities in Georgia Popular Among Indian Students ====
- Tbilisi State Medical University
- David Tvildiani Medical University
- Batumi Shota Rustaveli State University
- Iia State University
- Caucasus International University

== Far-East ==
=== China ===
Around 23,000 Indian students were enrolled in Chinese higher education institutions as of 2019, with a majority of them studying medicine.

In February 2020, India evacuated more than 600 of its students from Wuhan. Many Indian students have been stuck outside China following travel restrictions placed during the COVID-19 pandemic.

=== Philippines ===
Around 15,000 Indian students are present in the Philippines. Between 2,500 and 3,200 Indian students are studying medicine in the Philippines. Low tuition costs and the abundance of English speakers in the country drive attraction to the country. Agents are known to have extorted money from unsuspecting students travelling to the Philippines in hopes to further their education.

=== Singapore ===
There are around 80,000 international students in Singapore in 2023, with around 17000 Indian students immigrating from India to Singapore in 2022.

== Africa, West Asia, and Central Asia ==
=== Saudi Arabia ===
As of 2021, there are 80,800 Indian students in Saudi Arabia. About 26 institutions in Saudi Arabia offer scholarships to Indian students. Female students on scholarships are required to be accompanied by relatives.

70,800 Indian students were present in Saudi Arabia as of 2018.

In 2024, there were only 70,000 international students in Saudi Arabia. There were just under 68,000 international students in Saudi Arabia as of 2022, which is a decline from just over 75,000 international students in 2019. Some, Arabic media consider that the given figures might be counting children of labourers and other workers attending primarily and secondary schools in the country.

=== Uzbekistan ===
Uzbekistan has emerged as a growing destination for Indian medical aspirants pursuing MBBS abroad. As of 2025, over 15,000 Indian students are enrolled across seven medical universities in the country. Uzbekistan’s medical programs are recognized by global bodies such as the WHO, NMC (India), and FAIMER, and are conducted in English. Indian students are attracted by the combination of affordable tuition fees (approximately ₹3 lakhs per annum), globally accepted qualifications, and modern clinical training facilities. Notable universities include Fergana Medical Institute of Public Health, Tashkent Medical Academy, Bukhara State Medical Institute, and Samarkand State Medical University.

=== Kyrgyzstan ===
As of 2020, more than 10,000 Indian students are studying in Kyrgyzstan.

16,000 Indian students found themselves stranded in Kyrgyzstan during the COVID-19 pandemic. At least 145 were flown back by Air India to Delhi and various cities of India.

=== United Arab Emirates ===
Around 219,000 Indian students are living in the United Arab Emirates, as of 2021. Indian students in the UAE are heavily engaged in primary and secondary education, with more than 98,000 Indian students studying in private schools in Dubai alone. Of 30,000 students enrolled in Dubai's free-zone universities in 2019, 14% were from India.

From June 23, 2021, UAE eased travel restrictions with India, allowing Indian students access to Dubai's educational institutions. Dubai's Indian schools reported 50% on-campus attendance rates for pupils studying in the post-spring break session in 2021. Many students had not attended classes physically for up to a year.

As of 2024, there are around 230,000 international students in the UAE.

=== Bangladesh ===
An estimated 7,000 to 8,000 Indian students, mostly from Jammu and Kashmir, are enrolled in medical institutions in Bangladesh.

In March 2020, at least 64 students unsuccessfully attempted to cross the Bangladesh-India border from Bangladesh to India in a bus. As of May 2021, scores of Indian students were unable to return to their colleges in Bangladesh due to travel restrictions in place during the COVID-19 pandemic.

== Students from India in other countries ==
- Hong Kong - 916 Indian students as of 2022.
- Belarus - 906 Indian students as of 2022.
- Israel - 900 Indian students as of 2022.
- Mauritius - 807 Indian students as of 2022.
- Belgium - 764 Indian students as of 2022.
- Czech Republic - 658 Indian students as of 2022.
- Portugal - 415 Indian students as of 2022.
- Denmark - 369 Indian students as of 2022.
- Lithuania - 357 Indian students as of 2014.
- Bulgaria - 357 Indian students as of 2022.
- Egypt - 356 Indian students as of 2022.
- Austria - 350 Indian students as of 2022.
- Thailand - 297 Indian students as of 2022.
- Pakistan - 0 Indian students as of 2021.
- Guyana - 184 Indian students as of 2022.
- Taiwan - 150 Indian students as of 2022.
- Azerbaijan - 123 Indian students as of 2022.
- Barbados - 86 Indian students as of 2022.
- Luxembourg - 80 Indian students as of 2022.
- St. Vincent & Grenadines- 59 Indian students as of 2022.
- Turkey - 48 Indian students as of 2022.
- Brazil - 4 Indian students as of 2022.
- Bhutan - 4 Indian students as of 2022.
- Uzbekistan - 2 Indian students as of 2017.
- Greece - 2 Indian students as of 2017.
- Bosnia - 2 Indian students as of 2017.
- Vietnam - 1 Indian student as of 2022.
- Serbia - 1 Indian student as of 2017.
- Mongolia - 1 Indian student as of 2017.

== See also ==
- Immigration law
- International student
- Indian Diaspora
- H-1B visa
- Immigration to Canada
- Immigration to the United States
- Immigration to Australia
- Immigration to New Zealand
- Immigration to Germany
- Immigration to Russia
- Immigration to the United Kingdom
- Immigration to Japan
