= List of spacecraft deployed from the International Space Station =

This is a list of spacecraft deployed from the International Space Station. The International Space Station deploys spacecraft using the JEM Small Satellite Orbital Deployer (J-SSOD), the Nanoracks CubeSat Deployer (NRCSD), Space Station Integrated Kinetic Launcher for Orbital Payload Systems (SSIKLOPS), or the Nauka MLM experiments airlock module.

== List ==
=== 2005 to 2011 ===
Deployment date and time (UTC)	Satellite name	Operator	Transport to the ISS	Outcome
28 March 2005	(Russia) TNS-0	RNII KP	Progress M-52	Success
28 March 2005	Deployed from ISS during space walk.			
3 August 2011	(Russia) Kedr	RKK Energia	Progress M-09M	Success
3 August 2011	Deployed from ISS during space walk.			

=== 2012 ===
Deployment date and time (UTC)	Satellite name	Operator	Transport to the ISS	Outcome
20 August 2012; 18:29	(Russia) Sfera-53	Roscosmos	Progress M-16M	Success
20 August 2012; 18:29	Passive satellite, deployed from ISS during space walk.			
4 October 2012; 14:37	(Japan) WE WISH	Meisei Electric	HTV-3	Success
4 October 2012; 14:37	(Japan) Raiko	Tohoku and Wakayama universities	HTV-3	Success
4 October 2012; 15:44	(United States) TechEdSat	San Jose State University	HTV-3	Success
4 October 2012; 15:44	(Vietnam) F-1	FSpace Laboratory	HTV-3	Success
4 October 2012; 15:44	(Japan) FITSAT-1	FIT	HTV-3	Success

=== 2013 ===
Deployment date and time (UTC)	Satellite name	Operator	Transport to the ISS	Outcome
19 November 2013	(United States) ArduSat	NanoSatisfi	HTV-4	Success
20 November 2013; 07:58	(United States) TechEdSat-3p	NASA Ames	HTV-4	Success

=== 2014 ===
Deployment date and time (UTC)	Satellite name	Operator	Transport to the ISS	Outcome
28 February 2014	(United States) SkyCube	SkyCube	Cygnus CRS Orb-1	Success
28 February 2014	(Lithuania) LitSat-1	Kaunas University of Technology	Cygnus CRS Orb-1	Success
28 February 2014	First Lithuanian satellites in space			
28 February 2014	(Lithuania) Lituanica SAT-1	Lithuanian students	Cygnus CRS Orb-1	Success
28 February 2014	First Lithuanian satellites in space			

=== 2015 ===
Deployment date and time (UTC)	Satellite name	Operator	Transport to the ISS	Outcome
5 February 2015; 12:50	(Brazil) AESP-14	Instituto Tecnológico de Aeronáutica	SpaceX CRS-5	Success
5 February 2015; 12:50	First Brazilian CubeSat launched into space			
4 March 2015	(United States) TechEdSat-4	NASA Ames	Cygnus CRS Orb-2	Success

=== 2016 ===
Deployment date and time (UTC)	Satellite name	Operator	Transport to the ISS	Outcome
27 April 2016	(Philippines) Diwata-1	The Department of Science and Technology, the University of the Philippines, Hokkaido University and Tohoku University	Cygnus CRS OA-6	Success
27 April 2016	First Philippine microsatellite launched into space, and also the first one designed and built by Filipinos			
16 May 2016	(United States) MinXSS	University of Colorado Boulder	Cygnus CRS OA-4	Success
18 May 2016	(United States) Lemur-2 × 4	Spire Global	Cygnus CRS OA-6	Success

=== 2017 ===
Deployment date and time (UTC)	Satellite name	Operator	Transport to the ISS	Outcome
16 January 2017	(Brazil) Tancredo-1	INPE; EMTAM	HTV-6	Success
16 January 2017	Brazilian school project.			
6 March 2017	(United States) Lemur-2 × 4	Spire Global	HTV-6	Success
6 March 2017	(United States) TechEdSat-5	SJSU/UI	HTV-6	Success
16 May 2017	(Germany) SOMP 2	TU Dresden	Cygnus CRS OA-7	Success
16 May 2017	Part of QB50 program.			
16 May 2017	(United States) Columbia	Turabo University at Gurabo	Cygnus CRS OA-7	Success
16 May 2017	(Turkey) HAVELSAT	Istanbul Technical University	Cygnus CRS OA-7	Success
16 May 2017	(United States) SGSAT (KySat 3)	Kentucky Space	Cygnus CRS OA-7	Success
16 May 2017	(United States) IceCube	NASA	Cygnus CRS OA-7	Success
16 May 2017	(United States) CXBN-2	MSU	Cygnus CRS OA-7	Success
17 May 2017	(Taiwan) Phoenix	National Cheng Kung University	Cygnus CRS OA-7	Success
17 May 2017	(France) X-CubeSat	École Polytechnique	Cygnus CRS OA-7	Success
17 May 2017	(Sweden) qbee50-LTU-OC	Luleå University of Technology	Cygnus CRS OA-7	Success
17 May 2017	(United States) Altair 1	Millennium Space Systems	Cygnus CRS OA-7	Success
17 May 2017	(United States) SHARC	AFRL	Cygnus CRS OA-7	Success
18 May 2017	(South Korea) LINK	KAIST	Cygnus CRS OA-7	Success
18 May 2017	(South Africa) ZA-AeroSat	Stellenbosch University	Cygnus CRS OA-7	Success
18 May 2017	(United States) CSUNSat 1	CSUN	Cygnus CRS OA-7	Success
18 May 2017	(France) SpaceCube	Mines ParisTech	Cygnus CRS OA-7	Success
18 May 2017	(Israel) Hoopoe	Space Laboratory of the Herzliya Science Center	Cygnus CRS OA-7	Success
25 May 2017	(United States) Challenger	University of Colorado Boulder	Cygnus CRS OA-7	Success
25 May 2017	(China) NJUST 1	Nanjing University of Science and Technology	Cygnus CRS OA-7	Success
25 May 2017	(Australia) UNSW-EC0	University of New South Wales	Cygnus CRS OA-7	Success
25 May 2017	(Greece) DUTHSat	DUTH Space Research Laboratory	Cygnus CRS OA-7	Success
25 May 2017	(China) LilacSat 1	Harbin Institute of Technology, CAMSAT	Cygnus CRS OA-7	Success
25 May 2017	(South Africa) nSIGHT 1	SCS-Space	Cygnus CRS OA-7	Success
25 May 2017	(Spain) QBITO	Technical University of Madrid	Cygnus CRS OA-7	Success
25 May 2017	(Finland) Aalto 2	Aalto University	Cygnus CRS OA-7	Success
25 May 2017	(Australia) SUSat	University of Adelaide	Cygnus CRS OA-7	Success
26 May 2017	(South Korea) SNUSAT 1b	Seoul National University	Cygnus CRS OA-7	Success
26 May 2017	(Australia) i-INSPIRE 2	University of Sydney	Cygnus CRS OA-7	Success
26 May 2017	(Ukraine) PolyITAN 2-SAU	Igor Sikorsky Kyiv Polytechnic Institute	Cygnus CRS OA-7	Success
26 May 2017	(South Korea) SNUSAT 1	Seoul National University	Cygnus CRS OA-7	Success
26 May 2017	(Canada) Ex-Alta 1	University of Alberta	Cygnus CRS OA-7	Success
26 May 2017	(China) AoXiang 1	Shaanxi Engineering Laboratory for Microsatellites, NPU	Cygnus CRS OA-7	Success
26 May 2017	(Turkey) BeEagleSat	Istanbul Technical University, Turkish Air Force Academy	Cygnus CRS OA-7	Success
26 May 2017	(United States) Atlantis	University of Michigan	Cygnus CRS OA-7	Success
17 July 2017	(Japan) TOKI	Kyushu Institute of Technology	SpaceX CRS-11	Success
17 July 2017	Part of the Birds-1 program			
17 July 2017	(Ghana) GhanaSat-1	All Nations University	SpaceX CRS-11	Success
17 July 2017	Part of the Birds-1 program			
17 July 2017	(Mongolia) Mazaalai	National University of Mongolia	SpaceX CRS-11	Success
17 July 2017	Part of the Birds-1 program			
17 July 2017	(Bangladesh) BRAC Onnesha	BRAC University	SpaceX CRS-11	Success
17 July 2017	Part of the Birds-1 program			
17 July 2017	Nigeria EduSat-1	Federal University of Technology, Akure	SpaceX CRS-11	Success
17 July 2017	Part of the Birds-1 program			
20 November 2017	(United States) EcAMSat	NASA	Cygnus CRS OA-8E	Success
20 November 2017	(United States) ASTERIA	MIT/JPL	SpaceX CRS-12	Success
20 November 2017	(United States) TechEdSat-6	SJSU/UI/NASA Ames	Cygnus CRS OA-8E	Success

=== 2018 ===
Deployment date and time (UTC)	Satellite name	Operator	Transport to the ISS	Outcome
11 May 2018	(Turkey) UBAKUSAT	Istanbul Technical University	SpaceX CRS-14	Success
11 May 2018	(Kenya) 1KUNS-PF	University of Nairobi	SpaceX CRS-14	Success
11 May 2018	First Kenyan satellite launched into space			
11 May 2018	(Costa Rica) Irazú	Costa Rica Institute of Technology	SpaceX CRS-14	Success
11 May 2018	First Costa Rican satellite launched into space			
20 June 2018	(United Kingdom) RemoveDEBRIS	Surrey Satellite Technology	SpaceX CRS-14	Success
20 June 2018	The University of Surrey, Surrey Satellite Technology, Airbus Defence and Space, Innovative Solutions In Space, the Swiss Center for Electronics and Microtechnology, the French Institute for Research in Computer Science and Automation and Stellenbosch University took part in the project.			
13 July 2018	(United States) RaInCube	Jet Propulsion Laboratory	Cygnus CRS OA-9E	Success
13 July 2018	(United States) EQUiSat	Brown University Space Engineering	Cygnus CRS OA-9E	Success
10 August 2018	(Bhutan) BHUTAN-1	Built by Bhutanese engineers at the Kyushu Institute of Technology	SpaceX CRS-15	Success
10 August 2018	First Bhutanese satellite launched into space and part of the Birds-2 program			
10 August 2018	(Philippines) Maya-1	Built by students in Japan	SpaceX CRS-15	Success
10 August 2018	Part of the Birds-2 program			
10 August 2018	(Malaysia) UiTMSAT-1	Universiti Teknologi MARA	SpaceX CRS-15	Success
10 August 2018	Part of the Birds-2 program			
15 August 2018	(Russia) SiriusSat 1, 2	SPUTNIX	Progress MS-09	Success

=== 2019 ===
Deployment date and time (UTC)	Satellite name	Operator	Transport to the ISS	Outcome
31 January 2019	(United States) TechEdSat-8	SJSU, UIdaho, NASA	SpaceX CRS-16	Failure
17 June 2019	(Sri Lanka) Raavana 1	Sri Lankan scientists	Cygnus NG-11	Success
17 June 2019	First Sri Lankan satellite			
17 June 2019	(Nepal) NepaliSat-1	Nepalese scientists	Cygnus NG-11	Success
17 June 2019	First Nepali satellite launched into space. Part of the Birds-3 program.			
3 July 2019; 11:50:00	(Poland) KRAKsat	AGH University of Science and Technology / Jagiellonian University	Cygnus NG-11	Operational
3 July 2019; 11:50:00	(Poland) Swiatowid	SatRevolution	Cygnus NG-11	Operational
4 July 2019; 16:25:00	(France) EntrySat	ISAE-SUPAERO / ONERA	Cygnus NG-11	Operational

=== 2020 ===
Deployment date and time (UTC)	Satellite name	Operator	Transport to the ISS	Outcome
28 April 2020; 15:20	(Guatemala) Quetzal-1 (Guatesat-1)	UVG	SpaceX CRS-20	Operational
17 June 2020	(United States) Red-Eye 2	DARPA	Cygnus NG-13	Operational
23 June 2020	(United States) Red-Eye 3	DARPA	Cygnus NG-13	Operational
13 July 2020; 13:40:25	(United States) DeMi	MIT	Cygnus NG-13	Operational
13 July 2020; 16:55:25	(United States) TechEdSat-10	NASA	Cygnus NG-13	Success
5 November 2020; 09:05:01	(United States) SPOC	University of Georgia	Cygnus NG-14	Operational
5 November 2020; 10:40:00	(United States) NEUTRON-1	University of Hawaii	Cygnus NG-14	Operational
5 November 2020; 12:15:00	(United States) Lemur-2	Spire Global	Cygnus NG-14	Operational
5 November 2020; 13:15:01	(Canada) DESCENT	York University	Cygnus NG-14	Operational
5 November 2020; 13:15:01	(Israel) SATLLA-1	Ariel University	Cygnus NG-14	Operational
5 November 2020; 13:15:01	(United States) Lemur-2	Spire Global	Cygnus NG-14	Operational

=== 2021 ===
Deployment date and time (UTC)	Satellite name	Operator	Transport to the ISS	Outcome
14 March 2021; 11:20	(Japan) OPUSAT-II	Osaka Prefecture University/Muroran Institute of Technology	Cygnus NG-15	Success
14 March 2021	(Paraguay) GuaraníSat-1	Kyushu Institute of Technology/Paraguayan Space Agency	Cygnus NG-15	Operational
14 March 2021	(Philippines) Maya-2	Kyushu Institute of Technology	Cygnus NG-15	Operational
14 March 2021	(Japan) TSURU	Kyushu Institute of Technology	Cygnus NG-15	Operational
14 March 2021; 11:20	(Japan) RSP-01	Ryman Sat Project	Cygnus NG-15	Operational
14 March 2021; 11:50	(Japan) WARP-01	Warpspace	Cygnus NG-15	Success
14 March 2021; 14:30	(Israel) TAU-SAT1	Tel Aviv University	Cygnus NG-15	Success
14 March 2021; 15:00	(Japan) STARS-EC	Shizuoka University	Cygnus NG-15	Success
22 March 2021; 08:30	(Myanmar) (Japan) Lawkanat-1	MAEU / Hokkaido University	Cygnus NG-15	Operational
14 June 2021; 05:05	(United States) RamSat	Robertsville Middle School	SpaceX CRS-22	Operational
14 June 2021; 05:05	ELaNa 36 mission			
14 June 2021; 05:05	(United Kingdom) SOAR	University of Manchester	SpaceX CRS-22	Success
22 June 2021; 10:55	(Mauritius) MIR-SAT1	Mauritius Research and Innovation Council	SpaceX CRS-22	Success
6 October 2021; 09:20	(Australia) Binar-1	Curtin University	SpaceX CRS-23	Operational
6 October 2021	(Philippines) Maya-3	University of the Philippines Diliman / Kyushu Institute of Technology	SpaceX CRS-23	Operational
6 October 2021	(Philippines) Maya-4	University of the Philippines Diliman / Kyushu Institute of Technology	SpaceX CRS-23	Operational
6 October 2021; 10:55	(Australia) CUAVA-1	CUAVA	SpaceX CRS-23	Operational

=== 2022 ===
Deployment date and time (UTC)	Satellite name	Operator	Transport to the ISS	Outcome
26 January 2022; 12:00	(Italy) FEES2	GP Advanced Projects	SpaceX CRS-24	Operational
26 January 2022; 12:00	(United States) GASPACS	Utah State University	SpaceX CRS-24	Success
26 January 2022; 12:10	(United States) PATCOOL	University of Florida / NASA	SpaceX CRS-24	Operational
26 January 2022; 13:30	(United States) DAILI	The Aerospace Corporation	SpaceX CRS-24	Operational
26 January 2022; 13:40	(United States) TARGIT	Georgia Tech Research Corporation	SpaceX CRS-24	Success
3 February 2022; 08:55	(United Arab Emirates) (Bahrain) Light-1	UAESA / NSSA	SpaceX CRS-24	Operational
3 February 2022; 10:30	(United States) GT-1	Georgia Tech	SpaceX CRS-24	Operational
24 March 2022; 09:00	(Japan) IHI-SAT	IHI	Cygnus NG-17	Operational
24 March 2022; 12:10	(Japan) KITSUNE	HAK Consortium	Cygnus NG-17	Operational
21 July 2022 16:02-16:40	Expedition 67 EVA 3			
21 July 2022 16:02-16:40	(Russia) SWSU No5	SWSU - Research Institute of Space Instrumentation (part of Roscosmos)	Progress MS-19	Success
21 July 2022 16:02-16:40	(Russia) SWSU No6	SWSU - Research Institute of Space Instrumentation (part of Roscosmos)	Progress MS-19	-
21 July 2022 16:02-16:40	(Russia) SWSU No7	SWSU - Research Institute of Space Instrumentation (part of Roscosmos)	Progress MS-19	Success
21 July 2022 16:02-16:40	(Russia) SWSU No8	SWSU - Research Institute of Space Instrumentation (part of Roscosmos)	Progress MS-19	-
21 July 2022 16:02-16:40	(Russia) SWSU No9	SWSU - Research Institute of Space Instrumentation (part of Roscosmos)	Progress MS-19	Success
21 July 2022 16:02-16:40	(Russia) SWSU No10	SWSU - Research Institute of Space Instrumentation (part of Roscosmos)	Progress MS-19	Success
21 July 2022 16:02-16:40	(Russia) SWSU No11	SWSU - Research Institute of Space Instrumentation (part of Roscosmos)	Progress MS-20	Success
21 July 2022 16:02-16:40	(Russia) SWSU No12	SWSU - Research Institute of Space Instrumentation (part of Roscosmos)	Progress MS-20	Success
21 July 2022 16:02-16:40	This SWSU series (No6-12) create a peer-to-peer network			
21 July 2022 16:02-16:40	(Russia) Tsiolkovsky-Ryazan 1	Пущинская РадиоАстрономическая Обсерватория / Pushchino Radio Astronomy Observatory	Progress MS-20	Success
21 July 2022 16:02-16:40	(Russia) Tsiolkovsky-Ryazan 2	Пущинская РадиоАстрономическая Обсерватория / Pushchino Radio Astronomy Observatory	Progress MS-20	Success
21 July 2022 16:02-16:40	The Tsiolkovsky-Ryazan 1/2 satellites have special radio transmitting equipment designed to perform the scientific task of calibrating the sensitivity of radio telescopes of the Pushchino Radio Astronomy Observatory			
12 August 2022; 09:45	(Moldova) TUMnanoSAT	Curtin University	SpaceX CRS-25	Operational
12 August 2022; 09:45	(Japan) FUTABA	Kyushu Institute of Technology	SpaceX CRS-25	Operational
6 Sept 2022; 09:10 - 09:20	Expedition 67 Nanoracks CubeSat Deployer (NRCSD #23)			
6 Sept 2022; 09:10 - 09:20	(United States) D3 (Drag De-Orbit Device)	2U CubeSat from University of Florida	SpaceX CRS-25	Unknown
6 Sept 2022; 09:10 - 09:20	(United States) JAGSAT	2U CubeSat from University of South Alabama	SpaceX CRS-25	Unknown
6 Sept 2022; 09:10 - 09:20	(United States) CapSat-1	1U from The Weiss School	SpaceX CRS-25	Unknown
6 Sept 2022; 09:10 - 09:20	(United States) BeaverCube	3U from Massachusetts Institute of Technology Starlab	SpaceX CRS-25	Unknown
6 Sept 2022; 09:10 - 09:20	(United States) CLICK A	3U from NASA Ames, Massachusetts Institute of Technology, and Blue Canyon Technologies	SpaceX CRS-25	Unknown
2 December 2022	(Uganda) PearlAfricaSat-1	Uganda Science, Technology, and Innovation Office of the President	Cygnus NG-18	
2 December 2022; 07:50	(Japan) TAKA	Kyushu Institute of Technology	Cygnus NG-18	Success
2 December 2022	(Zimbabwe) ZIMSAT-1	Zimbabwe National Geospatial and Space Agency (ZINGSA)	Cygnus NG-18	Success
2 December 2022; 07:50	(Japan) SpaceTuna1	Kindai University	Cygnus NG-18	Success

=== 2023 ===
Deployment date and time (UTC)	Satellite name	Operator	Transport to the ISS	Outcome
6 January 2023; 08:02	(Indonesia) Surya Satellite-1	Surya University	SpaceX CRS-26	Success
6 January 2023; 09:00	(Japan) OPTIMAL-1	ArkEdge Space / University of Fukui	SpaceX CRS-26	Operational
6 January 2023; 09:32	(Japan) HSKSAT	Haradaseiki Co.	SpaceX CRS-26	Success
19 July 2023	(Philippines) Maya-5	University of the Philippines Diliman	SpaceX CRS-28	Success
19 July 2023	(Philippines) Maya-6	University of the Philippines Diliman	SpaceX CRS-28	Success

=== Spacecraft awaiting deployment ===
The following spacecrafts have been brought to the ISS and are scheduled to be deployed.

Deployment date and time (UTC)	Satellite name	Operator	Transport to the ISS	Outcome
18 December 2023	(Japan) BEAK	University of Tokyo / JAXA	SpaceX CRS-29	Awaiting deployment
18 December 2023	(Japan) Clark sat-1	Clark Memorial International High School	SpaceX CRS-29	Awaiting deployment

== See also ==
- Lists of spacecraft
