= Commercial Resupply Services =

NASA program for delivery of cargo to the ISS

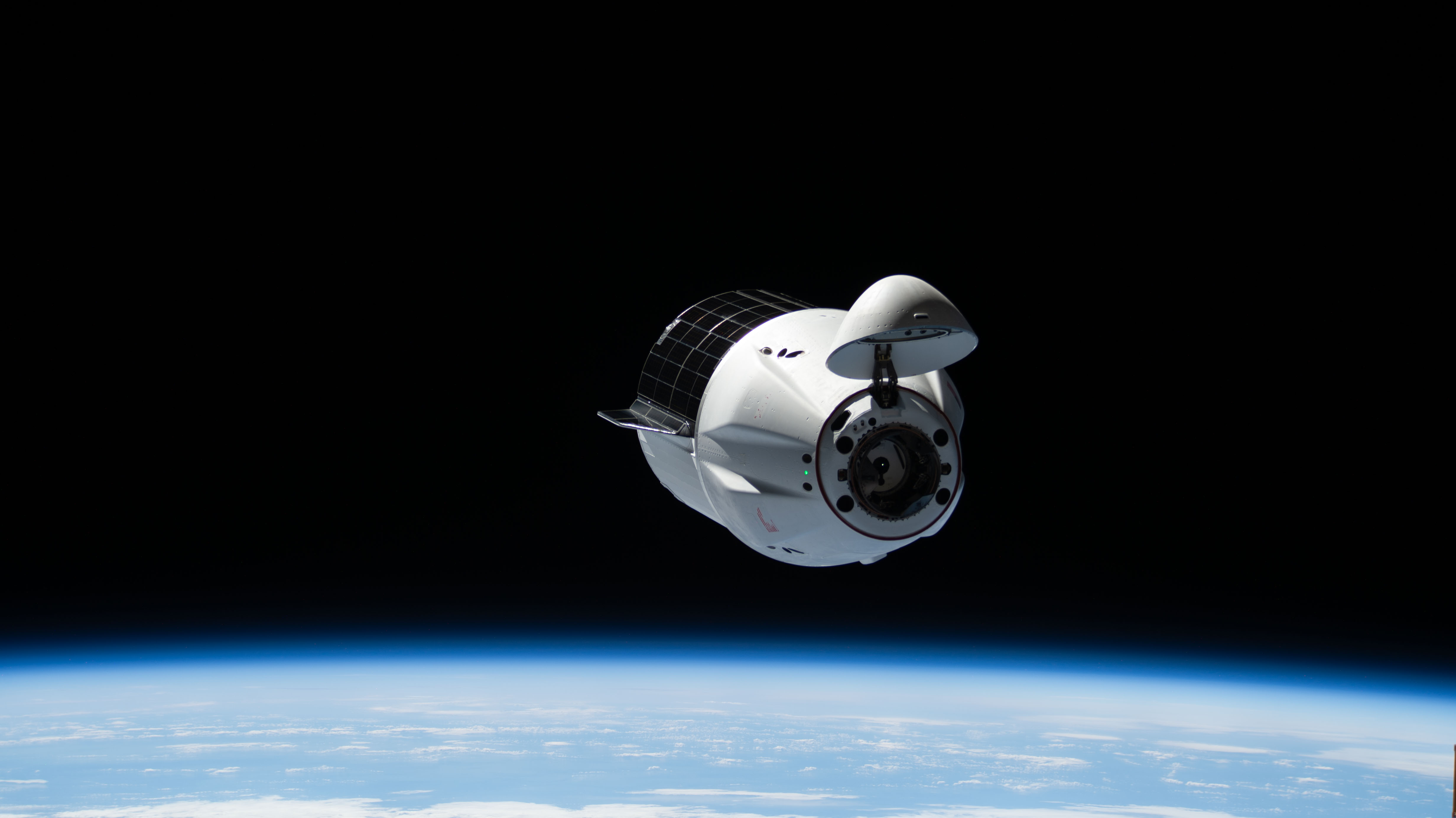
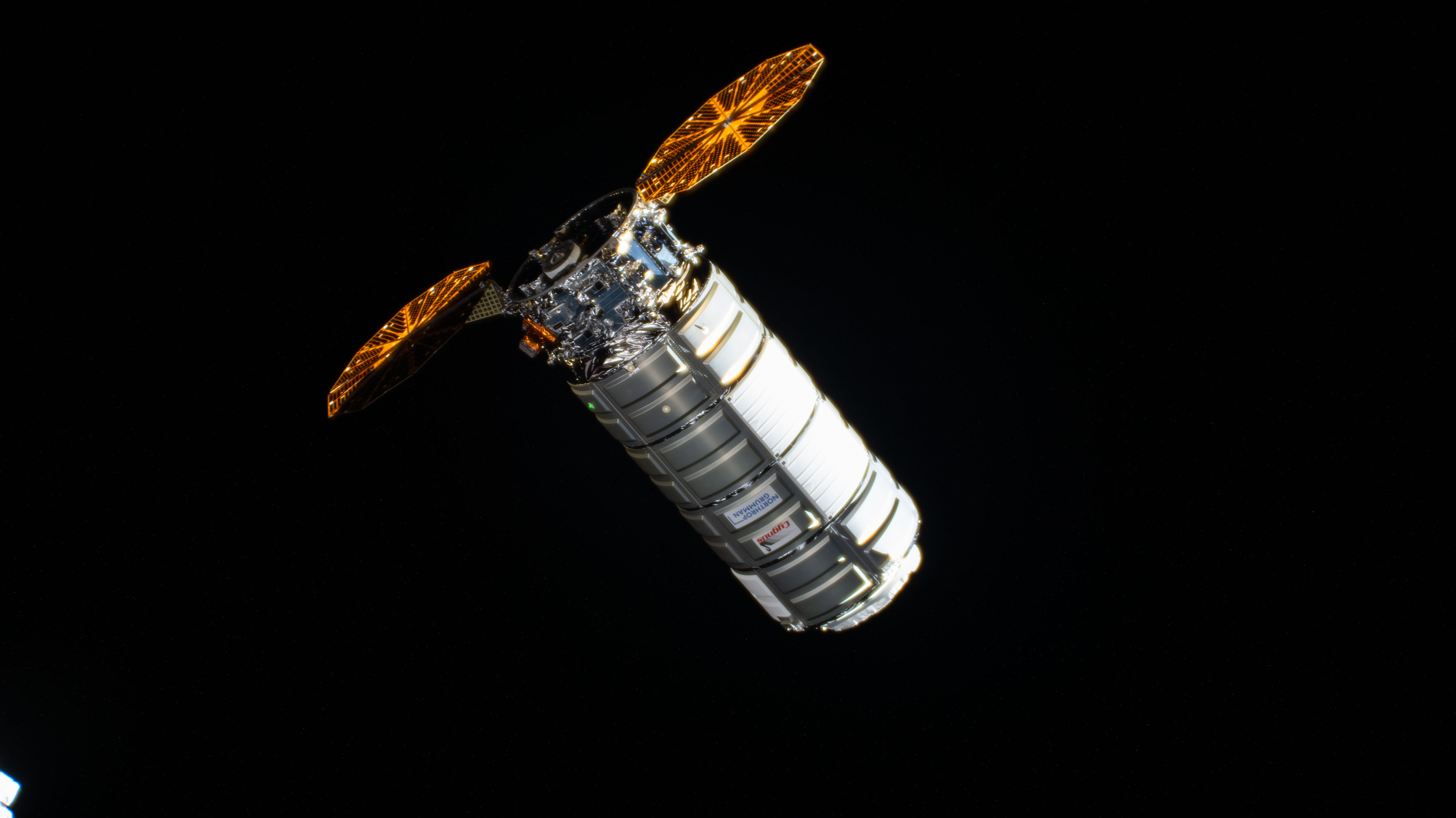
- Dragon 2 (left) and Cygnus XL (right), two of the Commercial Resupply Services spacecraft
- Type of project: Aerospace
- Owner: NASA
- Country: United States
- Established: 2008; 18 years ago
- Status: Active
- Website: nasa.gov/international-space-station/commercial-resupply

Commercial Resupply Services (CRS) are a series of flights awarded by NASA for the delivery of cargo and supplies to the International Space Station (ISS) on commercially operated spacecraft.

The first phase of CRS contracts (CRS-1) were signed in 2008 and awarded $1.6 billion to SpaceX for twelve Dragon 1 and $1.9 billion to Orbital Sciences (Note: Orbital Sciences was awarded a CRS contract in 2008. In 2015, Orbital Sciences became Orbital ATK through a business merger. Orbital ATK was awarded a CRS-2 contract in 2016. In 2018, Orbital ATK was acquired by Northrop Grumman.) for eight Cygnus flights, covering deliveries to 2016. The first operational resupply missions were flown by SpaceX in 2012 (CRS SpX-1) and Orbital in 2014 (CRS Orb-1). In 2015, NASA extended CRS-1 to twenty flights for SpaceX and twelve flights for Orbital ATK.

A second phase of contracts (CRS-2) was solicited in 2014. CRS-2 contracts were awarded in January 2016 to Orbital ATK's continued use of Cygnus, Sierra Nevada Corporation's new Dream Chaser, and SpaceX's new Dragon 2, for cargo transport flights beginning in 2019 and expected to last through 2024.

== COTS demo flights ==
NASA has been directed to pursue commercial spaceflight options since at least 1984, with the Commercial Space Launch Act of 1984 and Launch Services Purchase Act of 1990. By the 2000s funding was authorized for the Commercial Orbital Transportation Services (COTS) program, followed by the Commercial Crew Development program. The Antares and Falcon 9 launch vehicles and Cygnus and Dragon cargo spacecraft were developed using Space Act Agreements under the COTS program.

The first flight contracted by NASA, COTS Demo Flight 1, took place on December 8, 2010, demonstrating a Dragon capsule's ability to remain in orbit, receive and respond to ground commands, and communicate with NASA's Tracking and Data Relay Satellite System. On August 15, 2011, SpaceX announced that NASA had combined the objectives of the COTS Demo Flight 2 and following Flight 3 into a single mission. The rescoped COTS Demo Flight 2 successfully launched on May 22, 2012, delivering cargo to the ISS. The spacecraft reentered on May 31, landed in the Pacific Ocean, and was recovered, completing CRS certification requirements.

Orbital Sciences first launched the Antares rocket from the Mid-Atlantic Regional Spaceport on April 21, 2013, with a test payload. Orbital Sciences completed the Cygnus Orb-D1 demonstration flight on September 29, 2013, and the operational Cygnus CRS Orb-1 was launched January 9, 2014.

== CRS-1 selection process ==
On December 23, 2008, NASA announced the initial awarding of cargo contracts - twelve flights to SpaceX and eight flights to Orbital Sciences Corporation. PlanetSpace, which was not selected, submitted a protest to the Government Accountability Office. On April 22, 2009, the GAO publicly released its decision to deny the protest, allowing the program to continue.

== CRS-1 flights ==
Transport flights began under Commercial Resupply Services phase 1 (CRS-1) in 2012, ending in 2020. There were nineteen successful Dragon flights and one Dragon failure. There were ten successful Cygnus flights and one failure.

=== Dragon flights ===
Dragon departs ISS

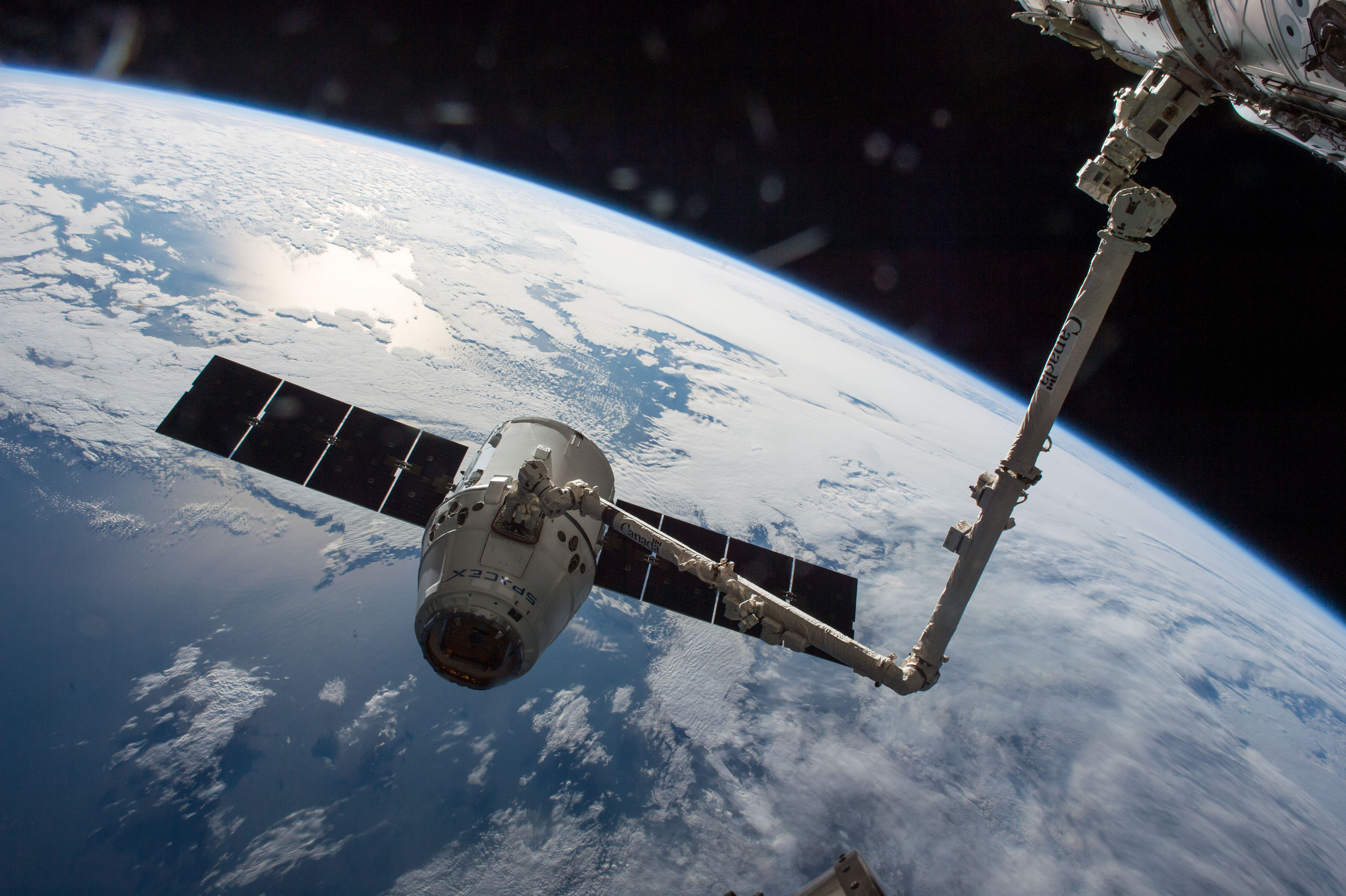
CRS-8 Dragon at ISS, 2016

These missions used SpaceX' original Dragon spacecraft, which has been retroactively referred to as "Dragon 1".

- CRS SpX-1: October 8, 2012
- CRS SpX-2: March 1, 2013
- CRS SpX-3: April 18, 2014
- CRS SpX-4: September 21, 2014.
- CRS SpX-5: January 10, 2015
- CRS SpX-6: April 14, 2015
- CRS SpX-7: attempted on June 28, 2015. Launch failure 139 seconds after lift-off, IDA-1 destroyed. Investigation traced the accident to the failure of a strut inside the second stage's liquid-oxygen tank. NASA concluded that the most probable cause of the strut failure was a design error: instead of using a stainless-steel eye bolt made of aerospace-grade material, SpaceX chose an industrial-grade material without adequate screening and testing and overlooked the recommended safety margin.
- CRS SpX-8: April 8, 2016
- CRS SpX-9: July 18, 2016
- CRS SpX-10: February 19, 2017
- CRS SpX-11: June 3, 2017
- CRS SpX-12: August 14, 2017
- CRS SpX-13: December 15, 2017
- CRS SpX-14: April 2, 2018
- CRS SpX-15: June 29, 2018
- CRS SpX-16: December 5, 2018
- CRS SpX-17: May 4, 2019
- CRS SpX-18: July 25, 2019
- CRS SpX-19: December 5, 2019
- CRS SpX-20: March 7, 2020

=== Cygnus flights ===
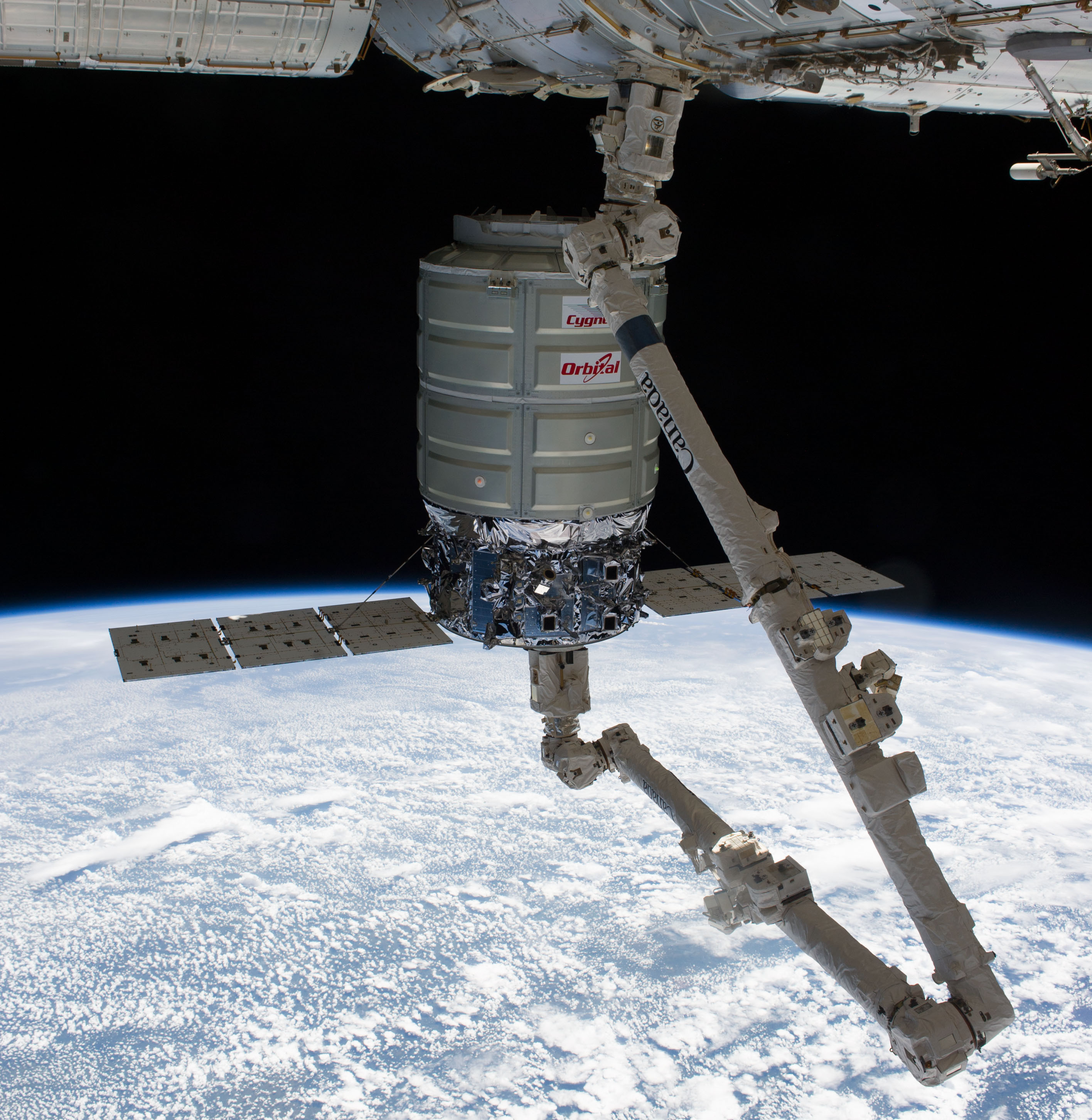
Standard size Cygnus (first three flights)

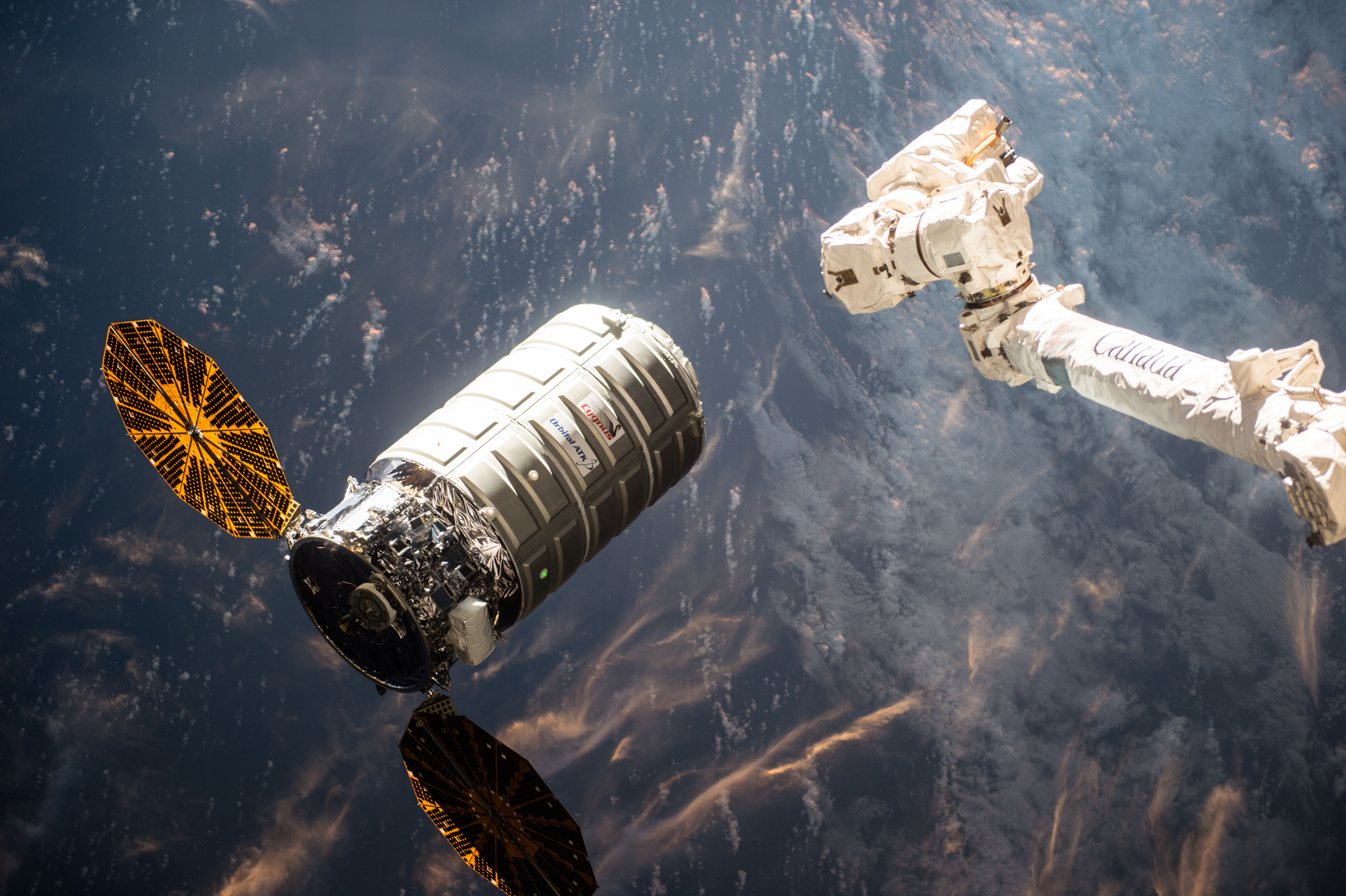
Enhanced size Cygnus (remainder)

- CRS Orb-1: (Note: Cygnus was owned and operated by Orbital Sciences for missions CRS Orb-1 to CRS Orb-3.) January 9, 2014
- CRS Orb-2: July 13, 2014
- CRS Orb-3: October 28, 2014 - launch failure, food and care packages for the crew, parts, experiments, and the Arkyd-3 Flight Test (Non-optical) Satellite from Planetary Resources lost.

Following the failure, the Antares rocket was upgraded to the 230 series which used newly built RD-181 first-stage engines to provide greater payload performance and increased reliability. The next two spacecraft were launched on the Atlas V. With the switch to more powerful launch vehicles and the introduction of a larger Enhanced Cygnus, enabled Orbital ATK to cover their initial CRS contracted payload obligation by OA-7.

- CRS OA-4: (Note: Cygnus was owned and operated by Orbital ATK for missions CRS OA-4 to CRS OA-9E.) December 6, 2015 - Atlas V, first Enhanced Cygnus
- CRS OA-6: March 23, 2016 - Atlas V
- CRS OA-5: October 17, 2016 - Antares 230
- CRS OA-7: April 18, 2017 - Atlas V

During August 2015, Orbital ATK disclosed that they had received an extension of the resupply program for four extra missions. These flights enable NASA to cover ISS resupply needs until CRS-2 begins.

- CRS OA-8E: November 12, 2017
- CRS OA-9E: May 21, 2018
- CRS NG-10: (Note: Cygnus has been owned and operated by Northrop Grumman since mission NG-10.) November 17, 2018
- CRS NG-11: April 17, 2019

== CRS-2 selection process ==
NASA began a formal process to initiate Phase 2 of the Commercial Resupply Services, or CRS-2, in early 2014. Later that year, an "Industry Day" was held in Houston, with seven high-level requirements disclosed to interested parties.

=== Requirements ===
The contracts were expected to include a variety of requirements:

- delivery of approximately 14,000 to 17,000 kg (31,000 to 37,000 lb) per year 55 to 70 m^{3} (1,900 to 2,500 cu ft) of pressurized cargo in four or five transport trips
- delivery of 24–30 powered lockers per year, requiring continuous power of up to 120 watts at 28 volts, cooling, and two-way communications
- delivery of approximately 1,500 to 4,000 kg (3,300 to 8,800 lb) per year of unpressurized cargo, consisting of 3 to 8 items, each item requiring continuous power of up to 250 watts at 28 volts, cooling, and two-way communications
- return/disposal of approximately 14,000 to 17,000 kg (31,000 to 37,000 lb) per year 55 to 70 m^{3} (1,900 to 2,500 cu ft) of pressurized cargo
- disposal of 1,500 to 4,000 kg (3,300 to 8,800 lb) per year of unpressurized cargo, consisting of 3 to 8 items
- various ground support services

=== Proposals ===
CRS-1 contractors Orbital Sciences and SpaceX each submitted CRS-2 proposals, joined by Sierra Nevada, Boeing, and Lockheed Martin.

SNC's proposal would use a cargo version of its Dream Chaser crew vehicle, the 'Dream Chaser Cargo System'. The proposed cargo Dream Chaser included an additional expendable cargo module for uplift and trash disposal. Downmass would only be provided via the Dream Chaser spaceplane itself. Boeing's proposal likewise used a cargo version of its CST-100 crew vehicle.

Lockheed Martin proposed a new cargo spacecraft called Jupiter, derived from the designs of the NASA's MAVEN and Juno spacecraft. It would have included a robotic arm based on Canadarm technology and a 4.4-meter (14 ft) diameter cargo transport module called Exoliner based on the Automated Transfer Vehicle, to be jointly developed with Thales Alenia Space.

=== Awards ===
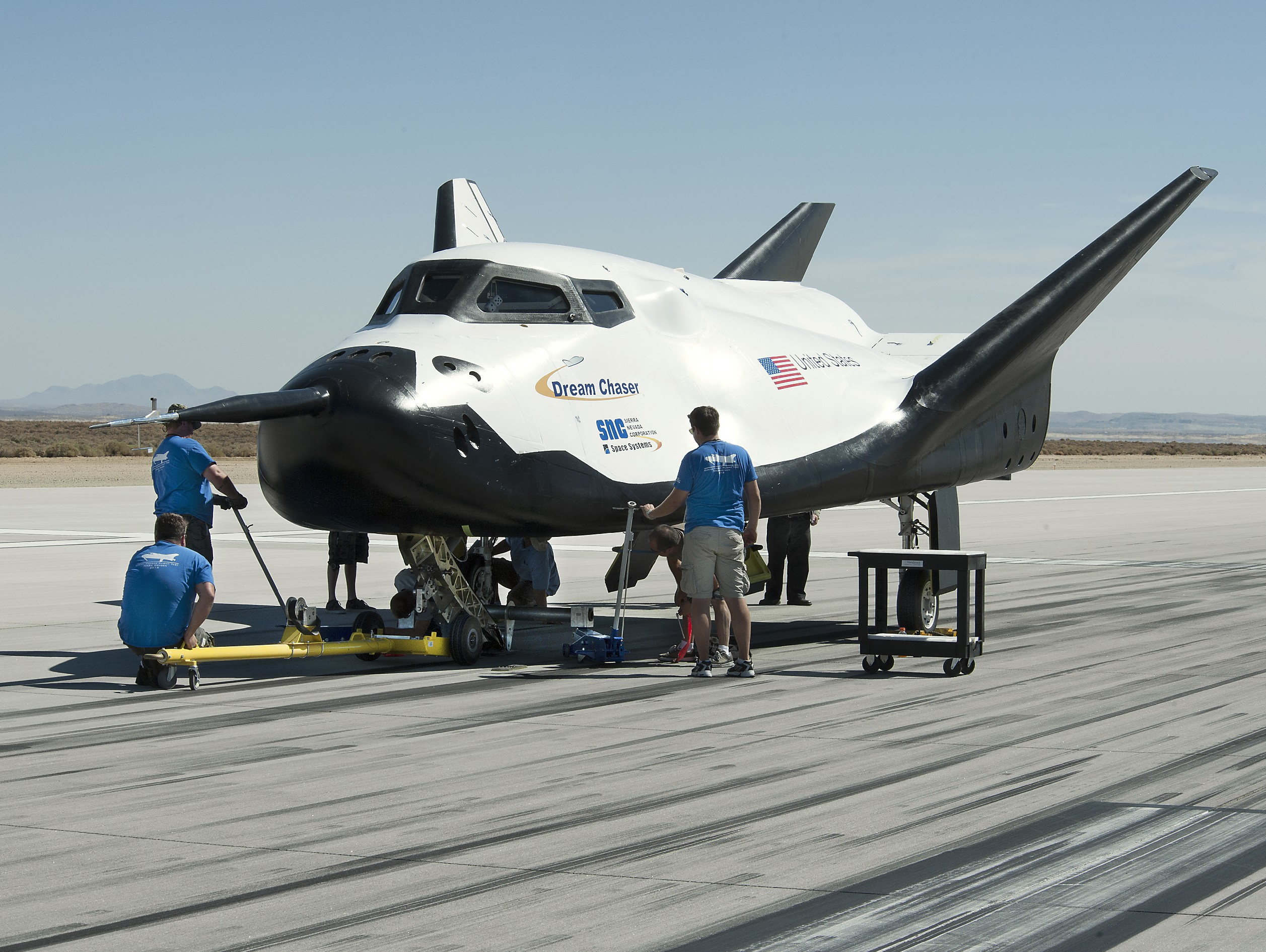
Sierra Nevada Dream Chaser in development, 2013 drop-test preparations shown

When NASA issued the Commercial Resupply Services phase 2 (CRS-2) request for proposal (RFP) in September 2014, it received interest from five companies: Lockheed Martin, Boeing, Orbital ATK, Sierra Nevada, and SpaceX. NASA made a competitive range determination to remove Boeing and Lockheed Martin.

Three companies were awarded contracts on January 14, 2016. Sierra Nevada Corporation's Dream Chaser, the SpaceX Dragon 2, and Orbital ATK Cygnus were selected, each for a minimum of six launches. The maximum potential value of all the contracts was indicated to be $14 billion, but the minimum value is considerably less. CRS-2 launches commenced in 2019 and were to extend to at least 2024. NASA officials explained that selecting three companies rather than two for CRS-2 increases cargo capabilities and ensures more redundancy in the event of a contractor failure or schedule delay.

Three more CRS-2 missions for Dragon 2 covering up to CRS-29 were announced in December 2020, and six more were awarded in 2022 covering up to CRS-35. The contracts were then extended to 2030.

Northrop Grumman having purchased Orbital ATK were awarded 2 more Cygnus flights in 2020 and 6 more in 2022 covering up to NG-35 to provide resupply services to the station through 2026. The contracts were then extended to 2030.

The CRS-2 flights commenced in November 2019 with the launch of Cygnus NG-12 mission.

Inside-cargo is typically transported to and from the space station in "the form factor of single Cargo Transfer Bag Equivalent (CTBE) [which is the] unit for size of bag used to transport cargo from visiting vehicles, such as SpaceX Dragon, Northrop Grumman Cygnus, or JAXA H-II Transfer Vehicle (HTV). The bags are sized at 48 cm × 41 cm × 23 cm (19 in × 16.25 in × 9 in) and limited in transport mass to 27 kg (60 lb) each. CTBE units are also used to price, and charge, commercial users of US Orbital Segment stowage space.

== CRS-2 flights ==
=== Cygnus flights ===
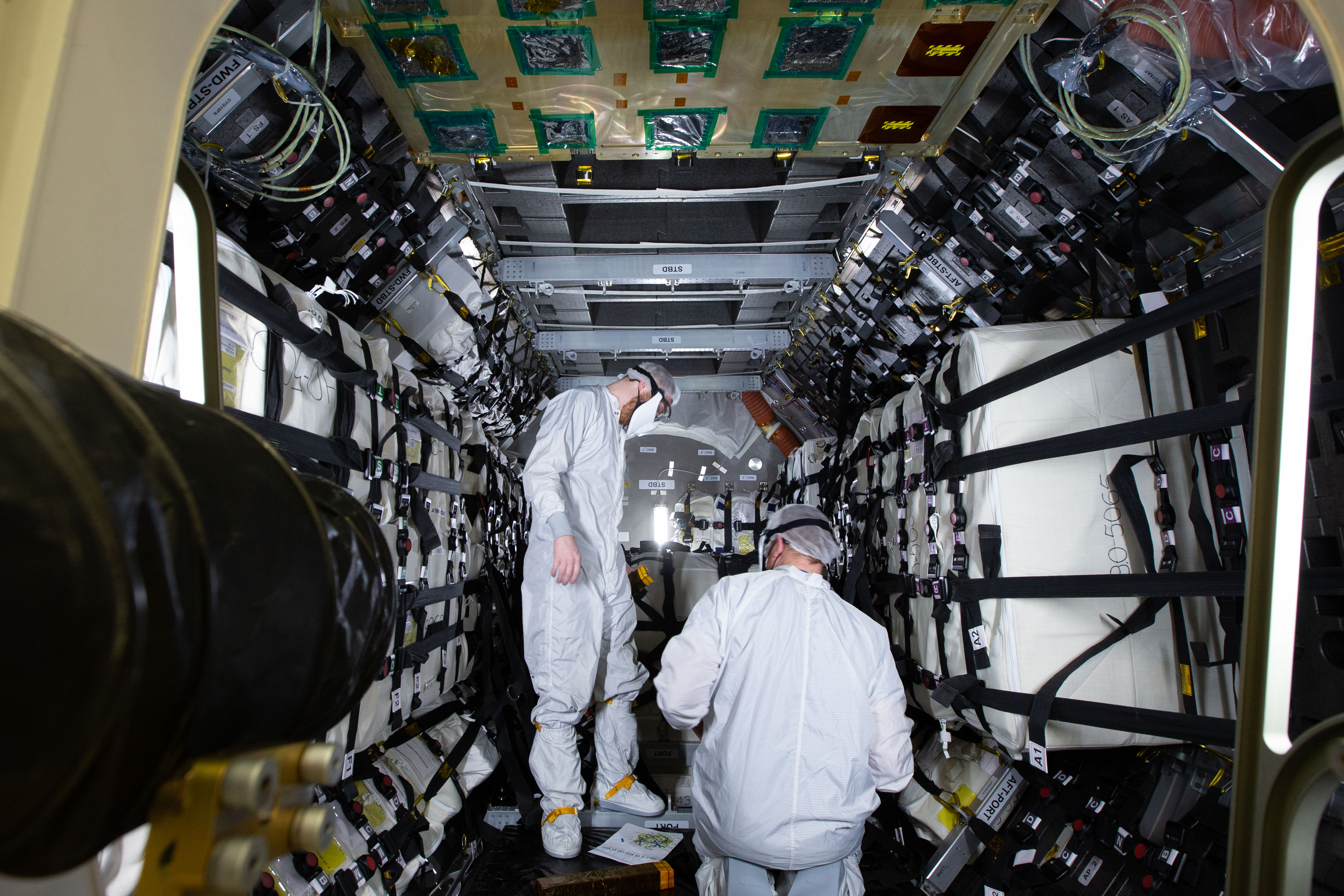
Cargo being loaded into Cygnus as part of CRS NG-15 in 2021

- CRS NG-12: November 2, 2019
- CRS NG-13: February 15, 2020
- CRS NG-14: October 3, 2020
- CRS NG-15: February 20, 2021
- CRS NG-16: August 10, 2021
- CRS NG-17: February 19, 2022
- CRS NG-18: November 7, 2022
- CRS NG-19: August 2, 2023

As a result Russia's invasion of Ukraine, Northrop Grumman was left with only two remaining Antares 230+ launch vehicles which were used for the CRS NG-18 and CRS NG-19 missions. Northrop Grumman initially acquired three flights from SpaceX with the Falcon 9 rocket while a replacement first stage and its engine are developed for its Antares 330 rocket. They added additional Falcon 9 launches as Antares was further delayed.

- CRS NG-20: January 30, 2024 - Falcon 9
- CRS NG-21: August 4, 2024 - Falcon 9
- CRS NG-22: TBD (indefinitely delayed after cargo module damaged during shipment)
- CRS NG-23: September 14, 2025 - Falcon 9, first Cygnus XL
- CRS NG-24: April 8, 2026 - Falcon 9
- CRS NG-25: November 29, 2026 (planned) - Falcon 9

Northrop Grumman plans to launch further missions using the new Antares 300 series (Antares 330) rockets with booster stage and engines developed by Firefly Aerospace.

=== Cargo Dragon flights ===
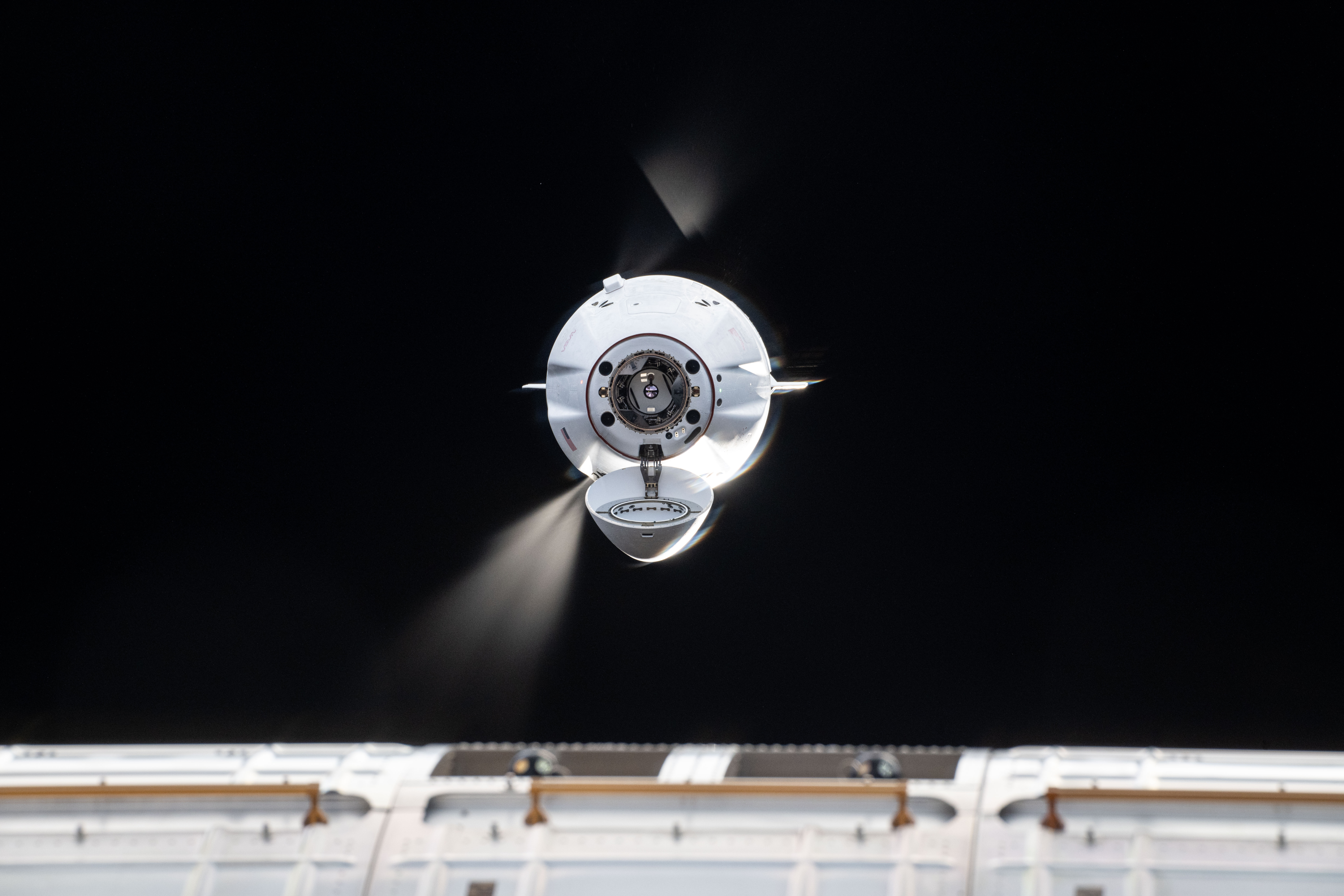
Cargo Dragon fires its Draco engines as it approaches during CRS SpX-33

- CRS SpX-21: December 6, 2020
- CRS SpX-22: June 3, 2021
- CRS SpX-23: August 29, 2021
- CRS SpX-24: December 21, 2021
- CRS SpX-25: July 15, 2022
- CRS SpX-26: November 26, 2022
- CRS SpX-27: March 14, 2023
- CRS SpX-28: June 5, 2023
- CRS SpX-29: November 10, 2023
- CRS SpX-30: March 21, 2024
- CRS SpX-31: November 5, 2024
- CRS SpX-32: April 21, 2025
- CRS SpX-33: August 24, 2025
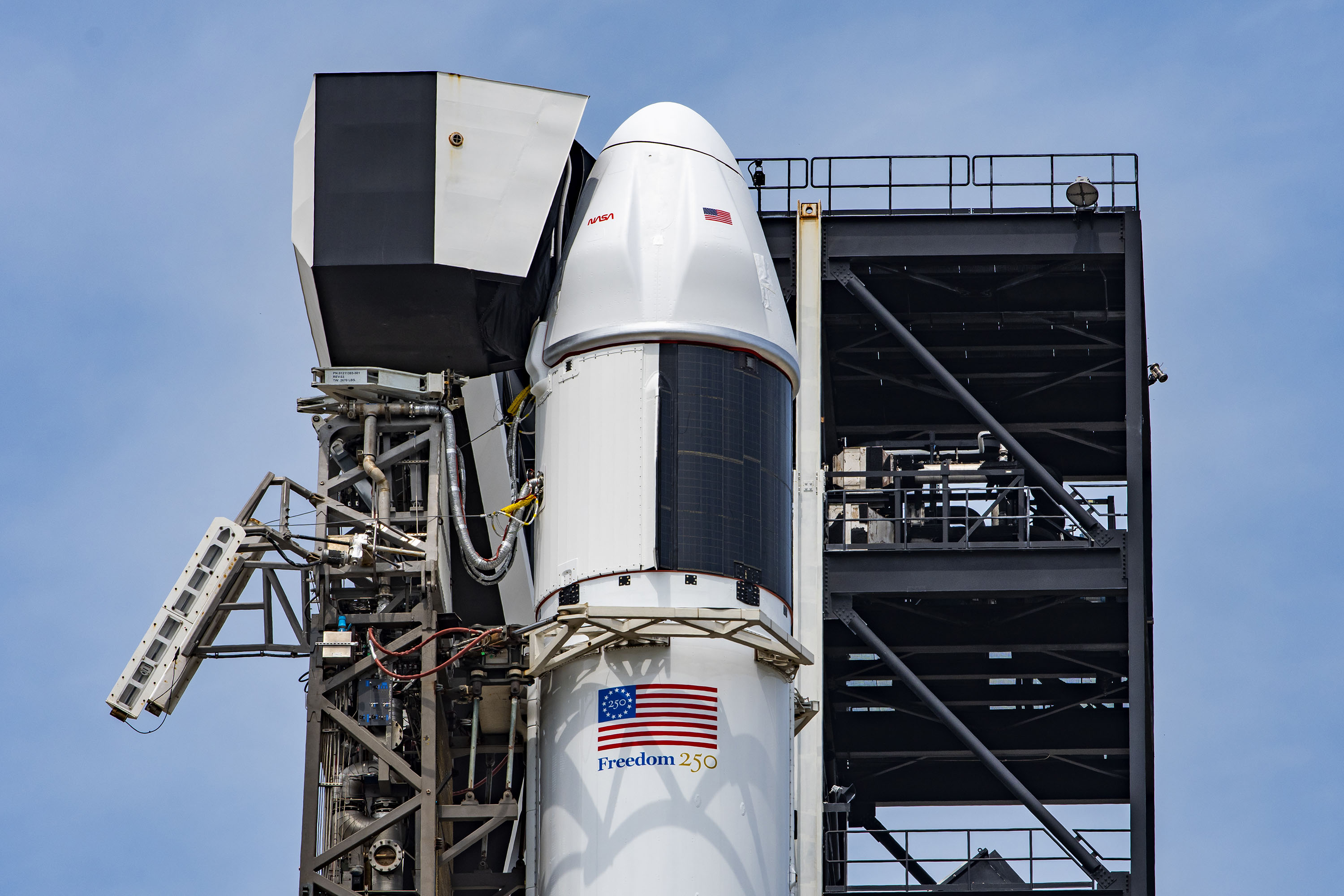
  SpaceX CRS-34 before its launch at SLC-40.
- CRS SpX-34: May 15, 2026
- CRS SpX-35: October 13, 2026
- CRS SpX-36: June 29, 2027 (planned)

=== Cargo Dream Chaser flights ===
- SSC Demo-1: 2027 (planned) (Note: Will not travel to the ISS)

== See also ==
- Commercial Crew Development (CCDev) – development of crew vehicles
- Commercial Lunar Payload Services
- Comparison of space station cargo vehicles
- Multi-Purpose Logistics Module
- Uncrewed spaceflights to the International Space Station
