= Progress MS-20 =

2022 Russian resupply spaceflight to the ISS

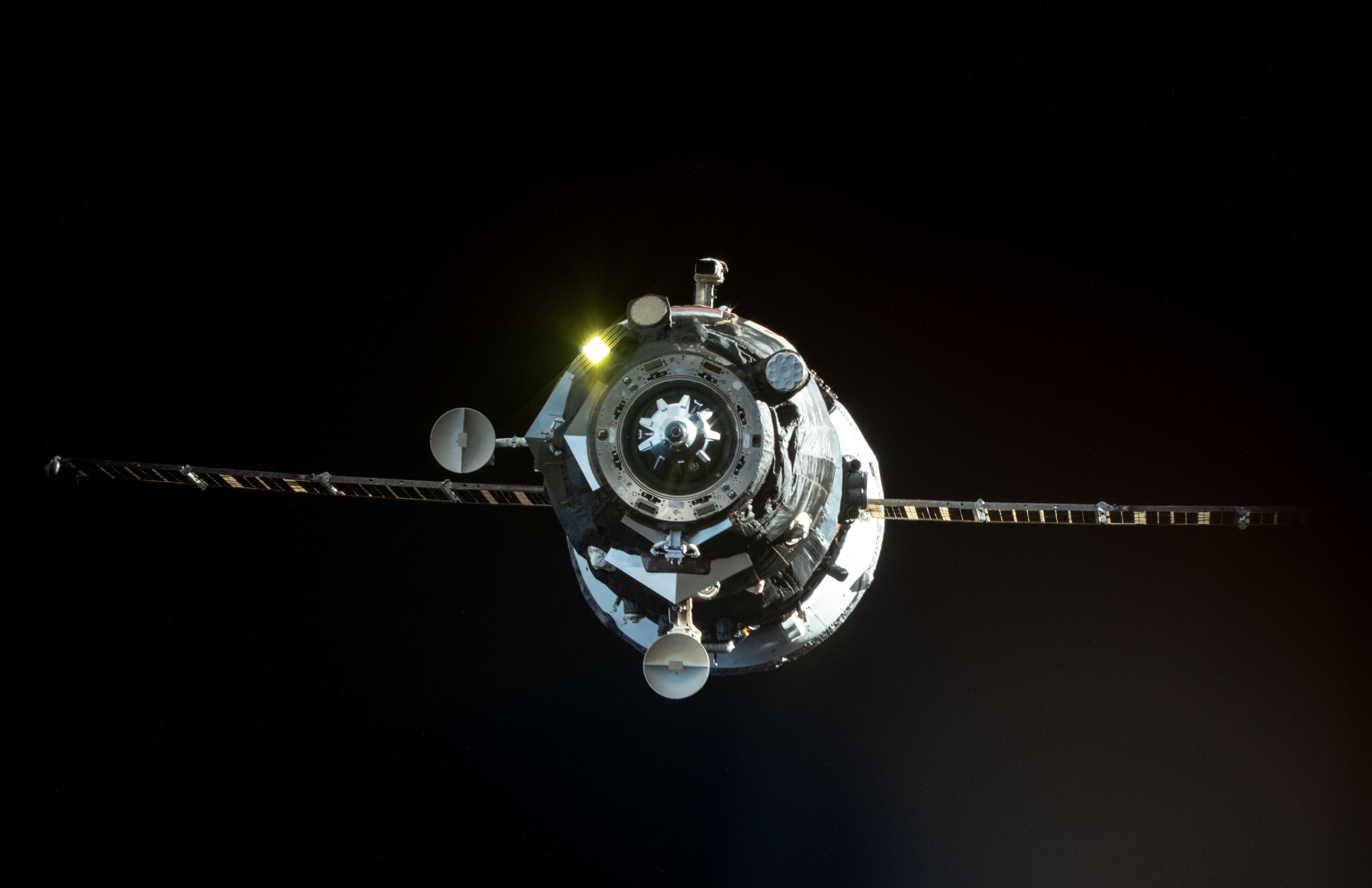
- Progress MS-20 approaches ISS
- Names: Progress 81P
- Mission type: ISS resupply
- Operator: Roscosmos
- COSPAR ID: 2022-059A
- SATCAT no.: 52795
- Mission duration: 248 days and 23 hours

Spacecraft properties
- Spacecraft: Progress MS-20 no.450
- Spacecraft type: Progress MS
- Manufacturer: Energia
- Launch mass: 7000 kg

Start of mission
- Launch date: 3 June 2022, 09:32:00
- Rocket: Soyuz-2.1a
- Launch site: Baikonur, Site 31/6
- Contractor: RKTs Progress

End of mission
- Disposal: Deorbited
- Decay date: 07 February 2023, 08:37 UTC

Orbital parameters
- Reference system: Geocentric orbit
- Regime: Low Earth orbit
- Inclination: 51.65°

Docking with ISS
- Docking port: Zvezda aft
- Docking date: 03 June 2022, 13:03 UTC
- Undocking date: 07 February 2023, 04:56 UTC
- Time docked: 248 days and 15 hours

Progress MS-20 (Russian: Прогресс МC-20), Russian production No.450, identified by NASA as Progress 81P, is a Progress spaceflight launched by Roscosmos to resupply the International Space Station (ISS). It is the 173rd flight of a Progress spacecraft.

== History ==
The Progress-MS is an uncrewed freighter based on the Progress-M featuring improved avionics. This improved variant first launched on 21 December 2015. It has the following improvements:

- New external compartment that enables it to deploy satellites. Each compartment can hold up to four launch containers. First time installed on Progress MS-03.
- Enhanced redundancy thanks to the addition of a backup system of electrical motors for the docking and sealing mechanism.
- Improved Micrometeoroid (MMOD) protection with additional panels in the cargo compartment.
- Luch Russian relay satellites link capabilities enable telemetry and control even when not in direct view of ground radio stations.
- GNSS autonomous navigation enables real time determination of the status vector and orbital parameters dispensing with the need of ground station orbit determination.
- Real time relative navigation thanks to direct radio data exchange capabilities with the space station.
- New digital radio that enables enhanced TV camera view for the docking operations.
- Unified Command Telemetry System (UCTS) replaces previous Ukrainian Chezara Kvant-V as the Progress spacecraft's on-board radio and antenna/feeder system.
- Replacement of the Kurs A with Kurs NA digital system.

== Launch ==
On 3 February 2021, the State Commission for Testing of the Piloted Space Systems, chaired by Roskosmos head Dmitry Rogozin, approved the latest ISS schedule for 2021 and the first quarter of 2022.

A Soyuz-2.1a launched Progress MS-20 to the International Space Station from Baikonur Site 31 on 3 June 2022 on a fast-track trajectory. Around 3 hours 20 minutes after the launch, Progress MS-20 automatically docked with Zvezda and continue its mission for 196 days, supporting Expedition 67 and Expedition 68 missions aboard the ISS.

== Cargo ==
The MS-20 cargo capacity is 2,500 kg (5,500 lb) as follows:

- Dry cargo: 1,458 kg (3,214 lb)
- Fuel: 599 kg (1,321 lb)
- Oxygen: 40 kg (88 lb)
- Water: 420 kg (930 lb)

A 3D printer will also be delivered to ISS by progress, along with 4 Russian experimental cubesats (ЮЗГУ No.11 & 12 / SWSU No11 & 12 plus Циолковский-Рязань 1 & 2/ Tsiolkovsky-Ryazan 1 & 2), which were deployed from the ISS by Russian Cosmonaut Oleg Artemyev during EVA 3 spacewalk. See 2022 List of spacecraft deployed from the International Space Station.

== See also ==
- Uncrewed spaceflights to the International Space Station
