= SpaceX CRS-23 =

2021 American resupply spaceflight to the ISS

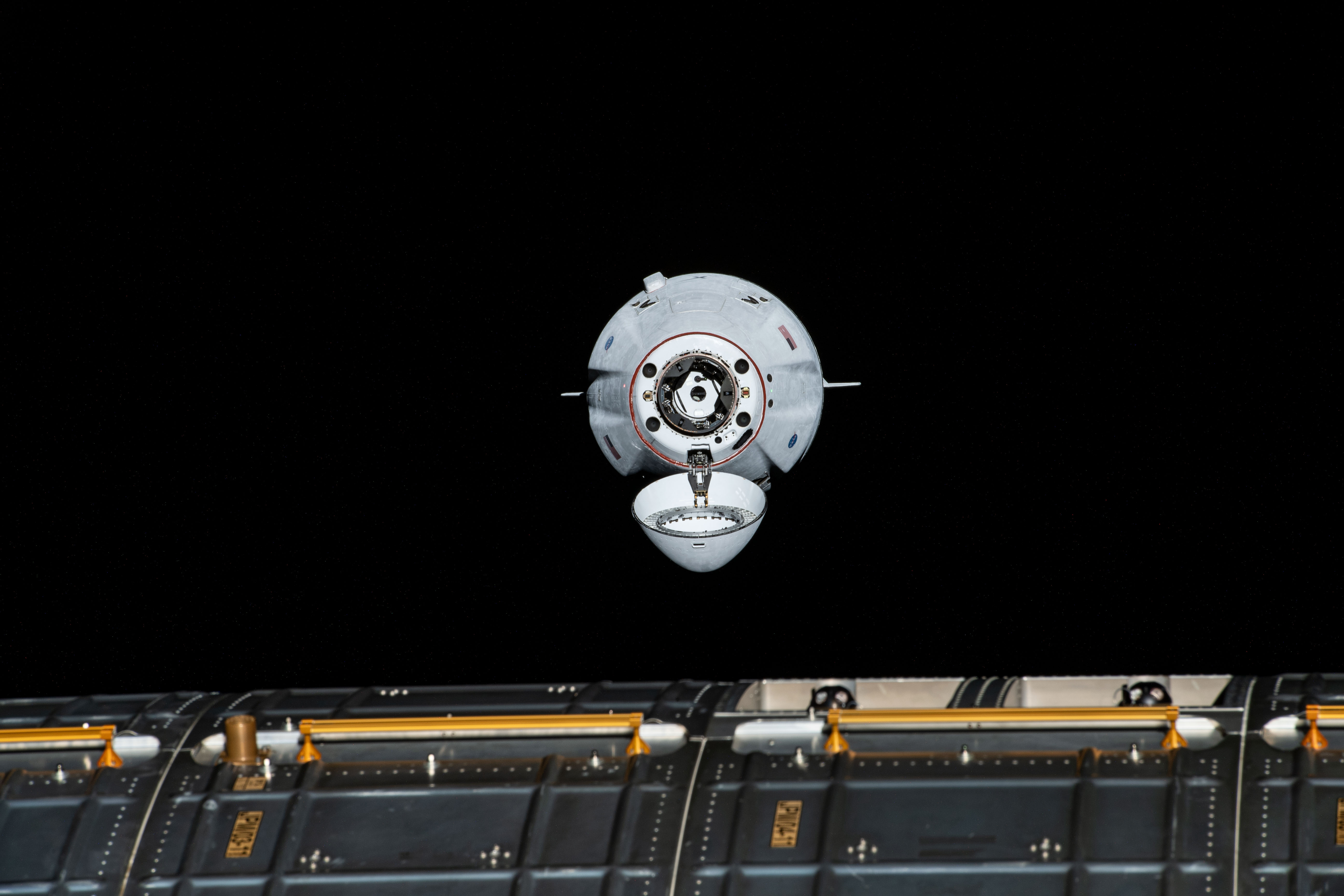
- On 30 August 2021, CRS-23 approaches the ISS for an autonomous docking to the Harmony module's forward international docking adapter.
- Names: SpX-23
- Mission type: ISS resupply
- Operator: SpaceX
- COSPAR ID: 2021-078A
- SATCAT no.: 49117
- Mission duration: 32 days, 19 hours, 42 minutes

Spacecraft properties
- Spacecraft: Cargo Dragon C208
- Spacecraft type: Cargo Dragon
- Manufacturer: SpaceX
- Launch mass: 6,000 kg (13,000 lb)
- Payload mass: 2,207 kg (4,866 lb)

Start of mission
- Launch date: 29 August 2021, 07:14:49 UTC
- Rocket: Falcon 9 Block 5 B1061-4
- Launch site: Kennedy Space Center, LC-39A

End of mission
- Recovered by: MV GO Searcher
- Landing date: 1 October 2021, 02:57 UTC
- Landing site: Atlantic Ocean

Orbital parameters
- Reference system: Geocentric orbit
- Regime: Low Earth orbit
- Inclination: 51.66°

Docking with International Space Station
- Docking port: Harmony forward
- Docking date: 30 August 2021, 14:30 UTC
- Undocking date: 30 September 2021, 13:12 UTC
- Time docked: 30 days, 22 hours, 42 minutes
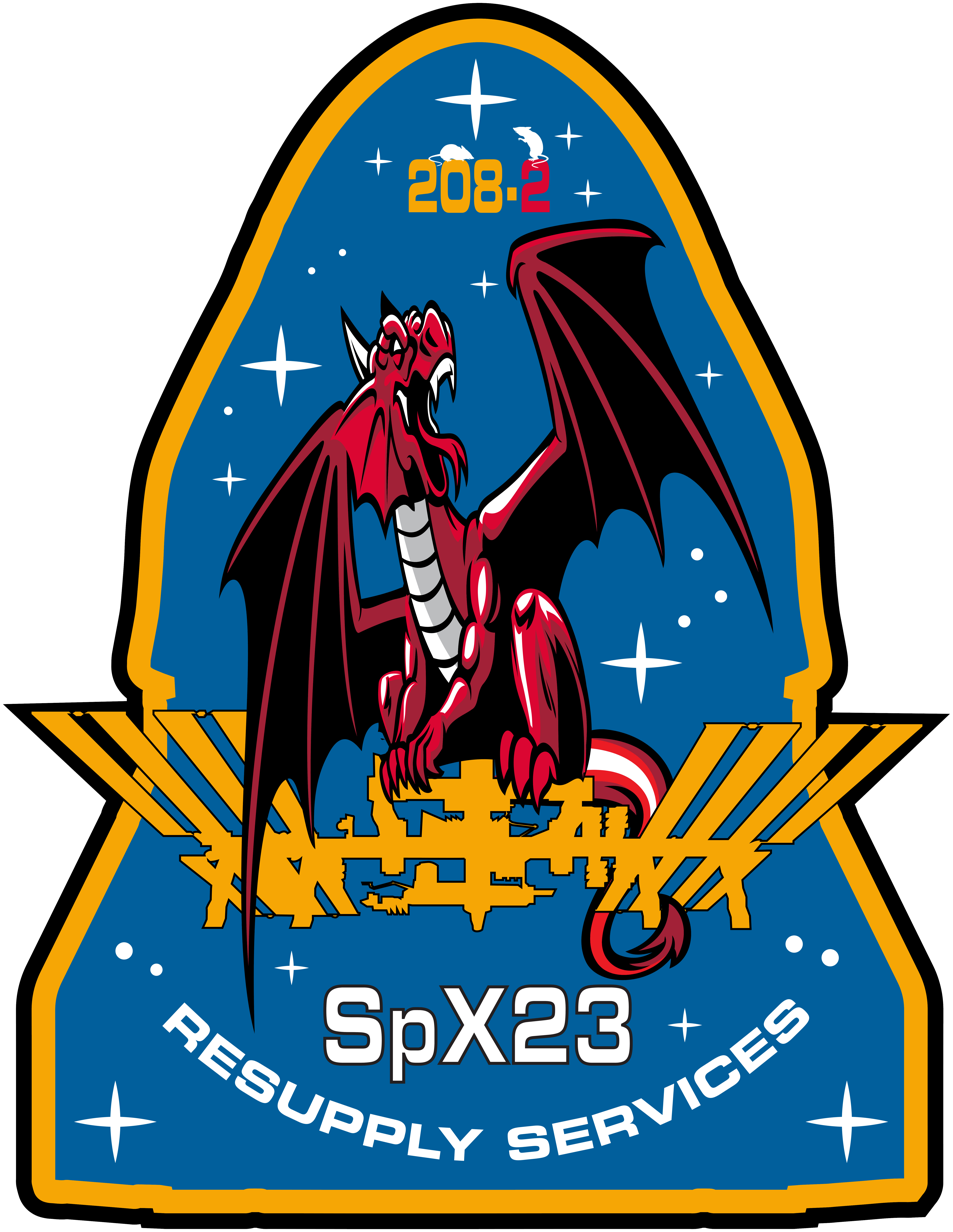
- SpaceX CRS-23 mission patch Commercial Resupply Services Cargo Dragon flights

SpaceX CRS-23, also known as SpX-23, was a Commercial Resupply Service mission to the International Space Station, successfully launched on 29 August 2021 and docking the following day. The mission was contracted by NASA and was flown by SpaceX using the Cargo Dragon C208. This was the third flight for SpaceX under NASA's CRS Phase 2 contract awarded in January 2016. It was the second mission for this reusable capsule.

Along with SpaceX Crew-2 (Endeavour) and Inspiration4 (Resilience), C208 was one of three SpaceX Dragon 2 spacecraft in space simultaneously from 15 to 18 September 2021.

== Cargo Dragon ==
Multiple views of CRS-23 mission Falcon 9 from liftoff to first-stage landing.

SpaceX plans to reuse the Cargo Dragons up to five times. Since it does not support a crew, the Cargo Dragon launches without SuperDraco abort engines, seats, cockpit controls or the life support system required to sustain astronauts in space. Dragon 2 improves on Dragon 1 in several ways, including lessened refurbishment time, leading to shorter periods between flights.

Cargo Dragon capsules under the NASA CRS Phase 2 contract splash down near Florida under parachutes in the Gulf of Mexico or the Atlantic Ocean.

== Payload ==
NASA contracted for the CRS-23 mission from SpaceX and therefore determines the primary payload, date of launch, and orbital parameters for the Cargo Dragon.

- Science investigations: 1,046 kg (2,306 lb)
- Vehicle hardware: 338 kg (745 lb)
- Crew supplies: 480 kg (1,060 lb)
- Spacewalk equipment: 69 kg (152 lb)
- Russian hardware: 24 kg (53 lb)

=== GITAI S1 Robotic Arm Tech Demo ===
The GITAI S1 Robotic Arm Tech Demo will test GITAI Japan Inc.'s microgravity robot by placing the arm inside the newly added Nanoracks Bishop Airlock, which was carried to the station by Dragon C208 during the SpaceX CRS-21 mission last year. Once inside the airlock, the arm will perform numerous tests to demonstrate its versatility and dexterity.

Designed by GITAI Japan Inc., the robot will work as a general-purpose helper under the pressurized environment inside the Bishop Airlock. It will operate tools and switches and run scientific experiments. The next step will be to test it outside the ISS in the harsh space environment. The robot will be able to perform tasks both autonomously and via teleoperations. Its arm has eight degrees of freedom and a 1-meter reach. GITAI S1 is a semi-autonomous/semi-teleoperated robotic arm designed to conduct specified tasks internally and externally on space stations, on-orbit servicing, and lunar base development. By combining autonomous control via AI and teleoperations via the specially designed GITAI manipulation system H1, GITAI S1 on its own, possesses the capability to conduct generous-purpose tasks (manipulation of switches, tools, soft objects; conducting science experiments and assembly; high-load operations; etc.) that were extremely difficult for industrial robots such as task specific robotic arms to do.

== Research ==
NASA Glenn Research Center studies:

- Flow Boiling and Condensation Experiment (FBCE) insert for the Fluids Integrated Rack (FIR)
- Support hardware for Solid Fuel Ignition and Extinction (SoFIE) insert for the Combustion Integrated Rack (CIR), remaining SoFIE hardware to fly on SpaceX CRS-24.

Student Spaceflight Experiments Program The Student Spaceflight Experiments Program (SSEP) has five experiments manifested:

- Mission 14C - 2 experiments
- Mission 15B - 3 experiments

Malta's First In Space

- Malta sent its very first space bioscience experiment entitled SpaceOMIX as a first mission under the Maleth Program. The first mission will be investigating the skin microbiome of diabetic foot ulcers resistant to conventional treatment. Experiments will include a full multi-omic analysis before and after spaceflight takes place. The experiment is also taking a large number of STEM-based science messages from people including school children of all ages to be part of this historic first mission to the International Space Station. The specially designed biocube based on the ICECubes platform is done in collaboration with Space Applications Services based in Belgium.

European Space Agency (ESA) research and activities:

- ESA's BIOFILMS (Biofilm Inhibition On Flight equipment and on board the ISS using microbiologically Lethal Metal Surfaces) experiment investigating bacterial biofilm formation and antimicrobial properties of different metal surfaces under spaceflight conditions in altered gravity.
- ESA's Orbit Your Thesis!: OSCAR-QUBE -Designed, built and tested in a period of 14 months by a team of university students from Hasselt University in Belgium, OSCAR-QUBE will be installed in the Columbus Laboratory's ICECubes facility owned and operated by Space Applications Services. The team took part in ESA's Education programme called Orbit Your Thesis! (OYT) and proposed the experiment which is a diamond quantum-based magnetometer with femto Tesla precision. The team are the first to launch their experiment as part of the OYT programme and are the first students from their university to launch an experiment to the ISS.

== CubeSats ==
CubeSats included in this mission (ELaNa 37):

- PR-CuNaR2 - CubeSat NanoRocks2, Inter American University of Puerto Rico
- Amber IOD-3 – Horizon Space Technologies, UK
- Binar-1 – Space Science and Technology Centre, Curtin University, Australia
- CUAVA-1 – ARC Training Centre for CubeSats, UAVs and Their Applications, HQ at The University of Sydney, Australia
- CAPSat - Cool Annealing Payload Satellite, University of Illinois at Urbana-Champaign, US
- Maya-3 and Maya-4 – University of the Philippines-Diliman and Kyushu Institute of Technology, Japan
- SPACE HAUC – Science Program Around Communications Engineering with High Achieving Undergraduate Cadres, University of Massachusetts Lowell, US

== Gallery ==
SpaceX CRS-23
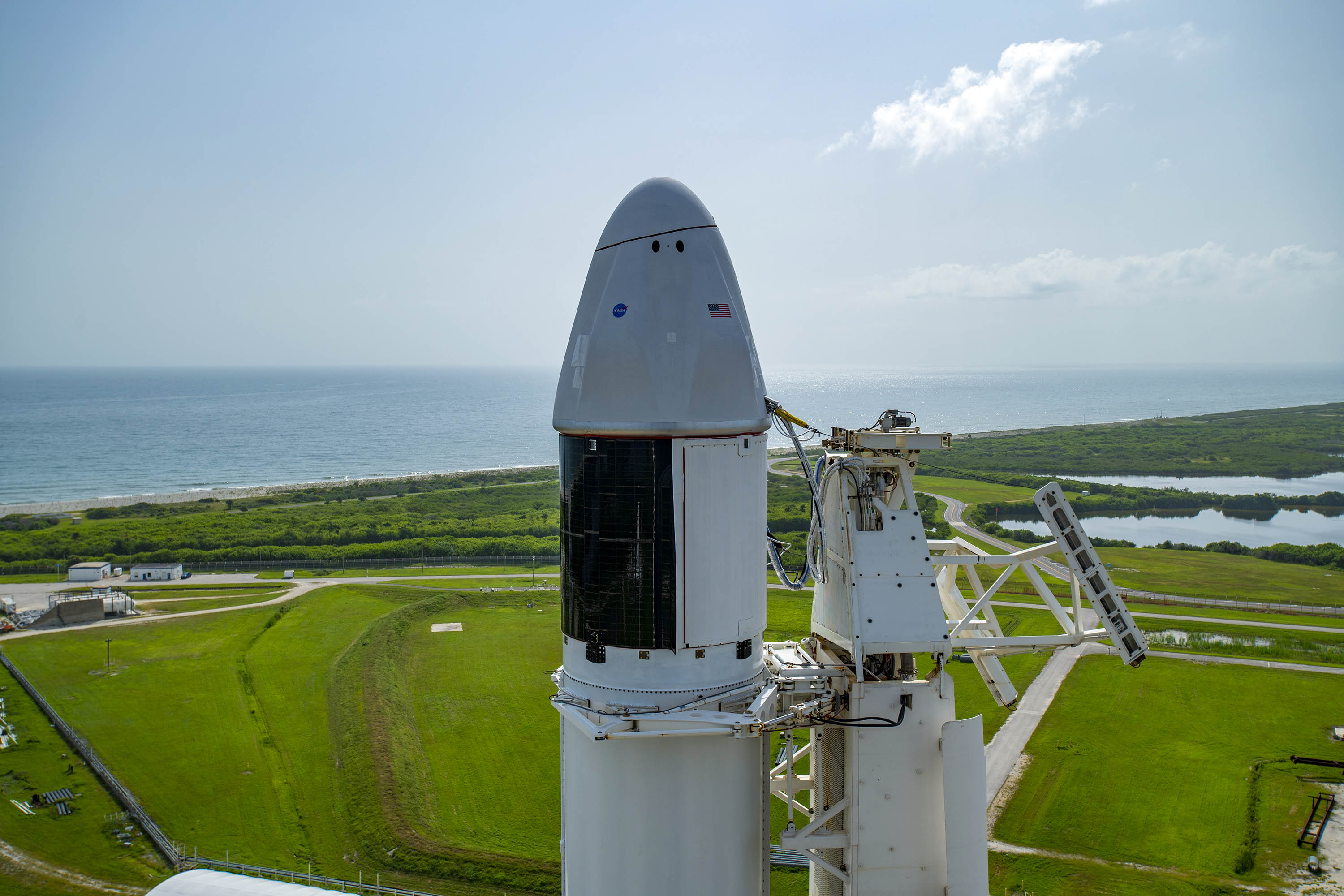
CRS-23 on the pad

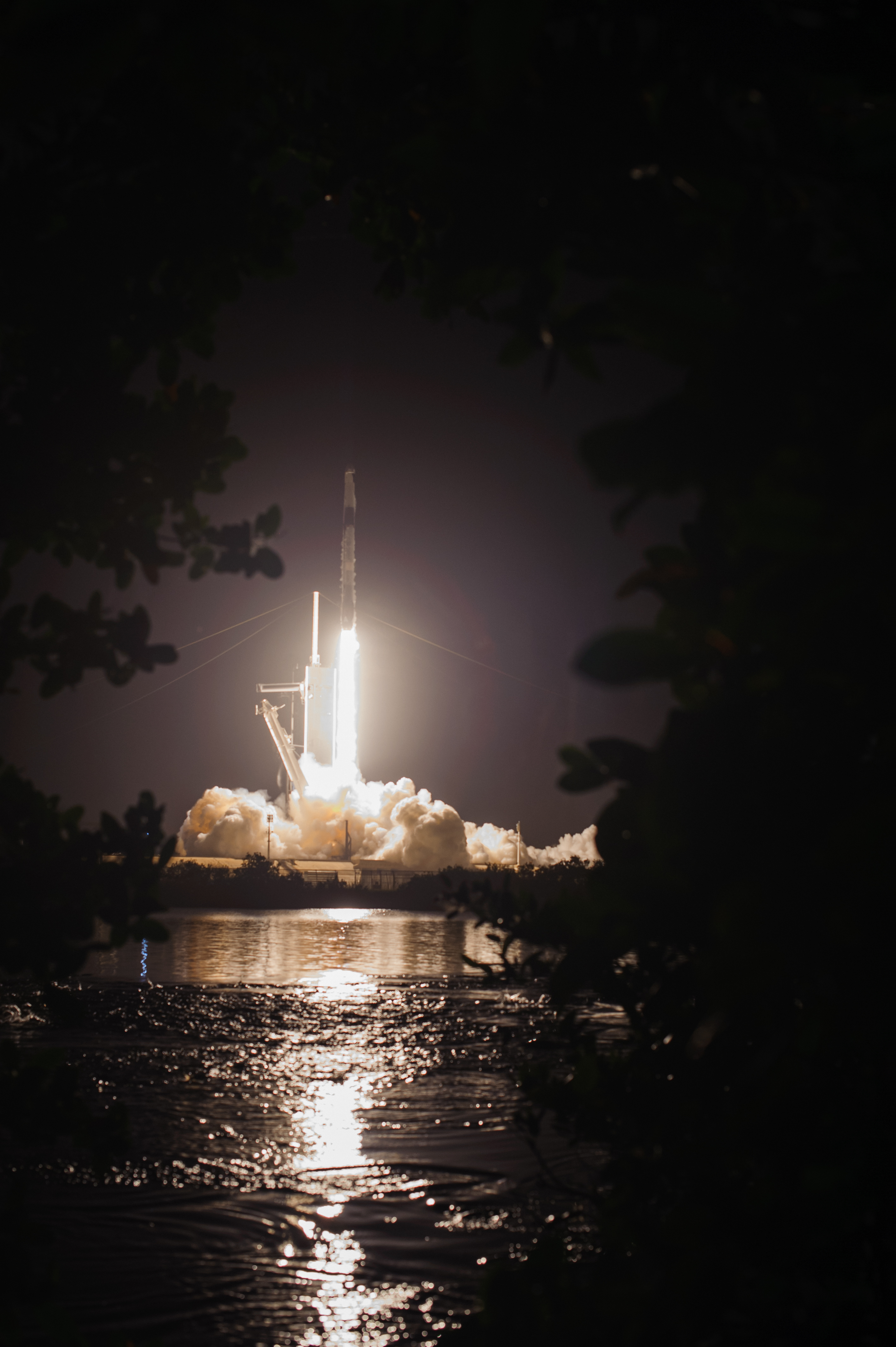
Launch of CRS-23

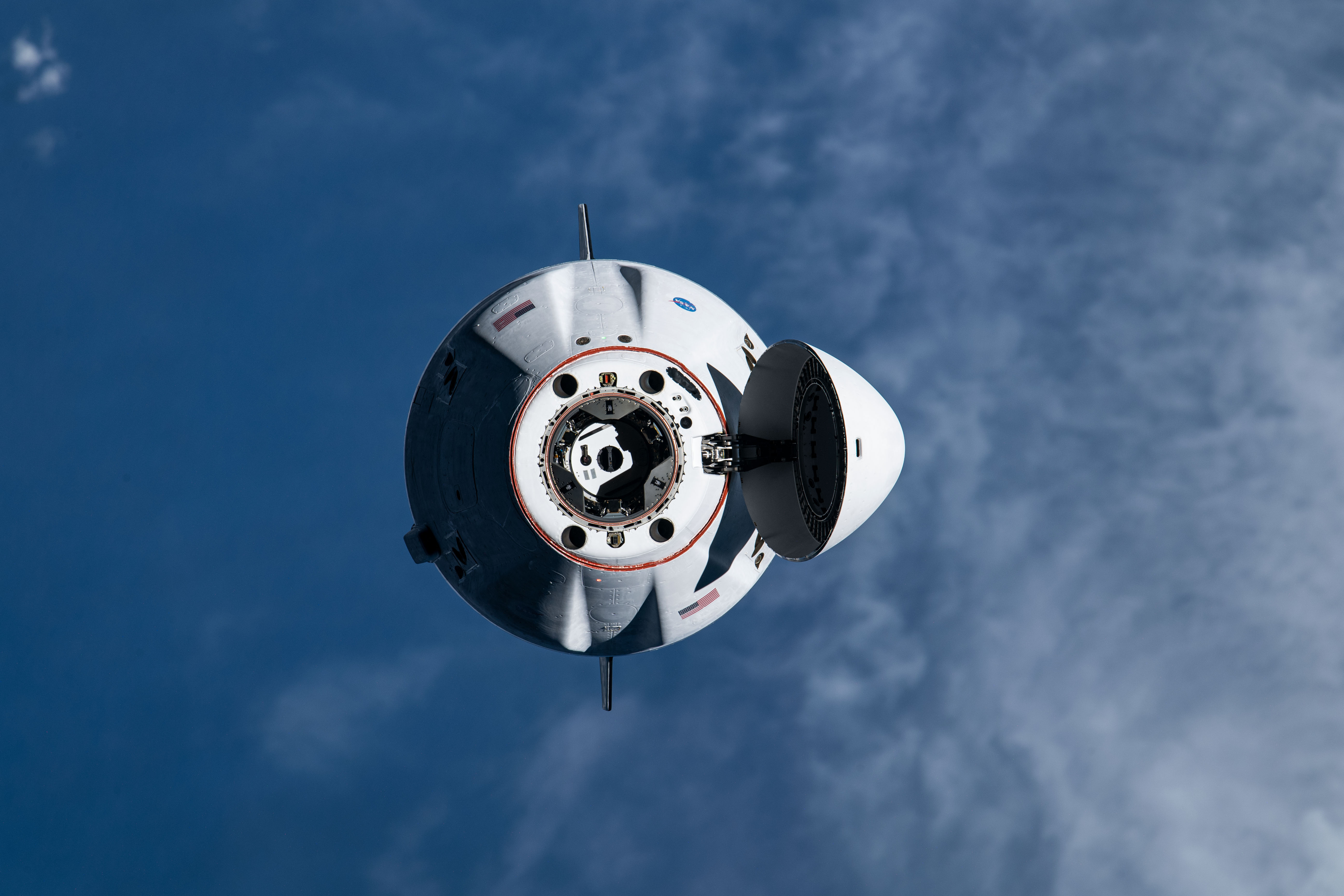
Cargo Dragon approaching the ISS

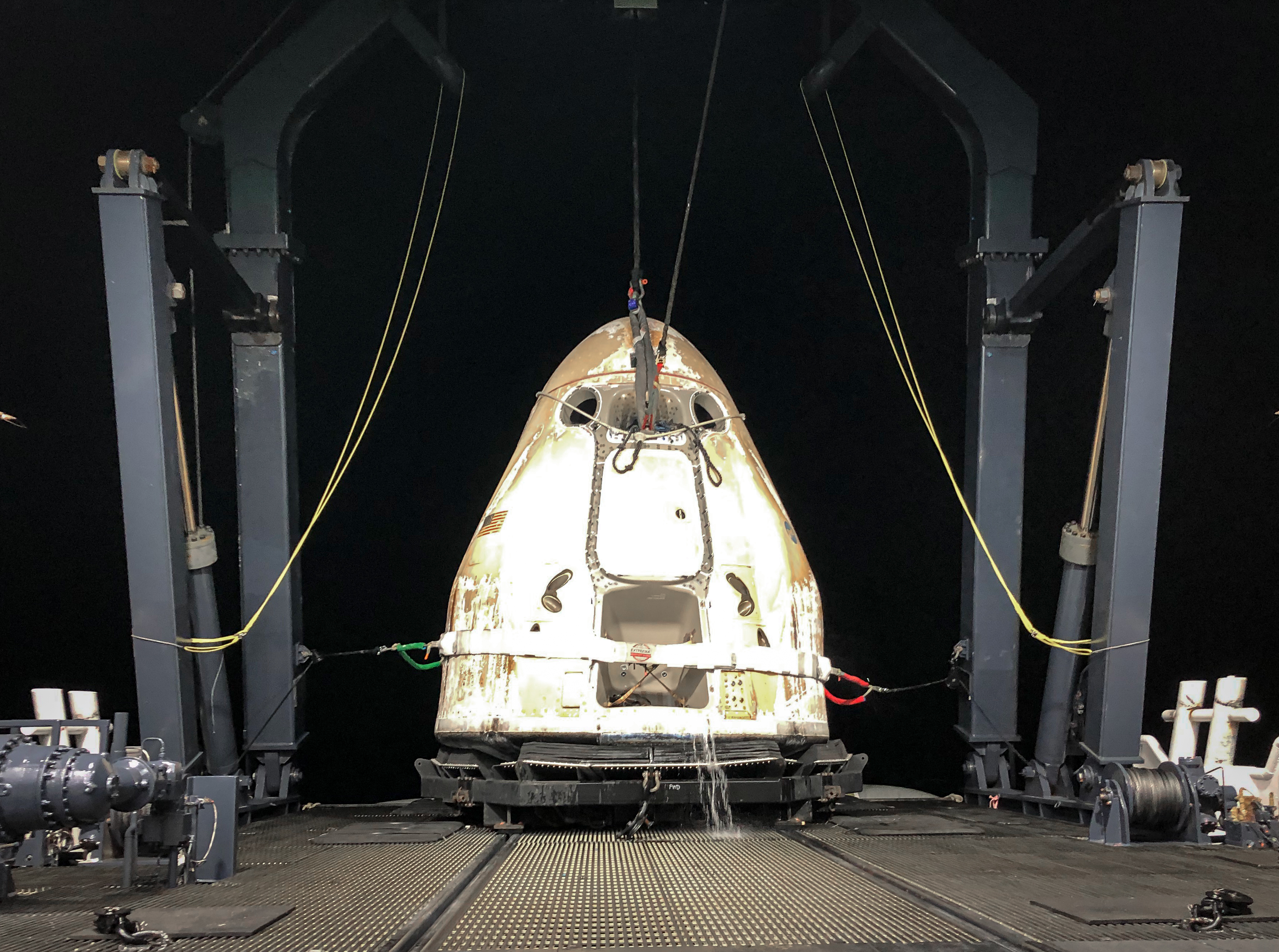
Cargo Dragon after splashdown

== See also ==
- Uncrewed spaceflights to the International Space Station
