= The Weiss School =

The Weiss School for Gifted and Talented Students

Location
- 4176 Burns Rd; Palm Beach Gardens, Florida, Palm Beach County; United States; 26.8307°N 80.1000°W

Information
- Type: Private school
- Motto: Inspiring Bright Minds
- Established: 1989
- Founder: Elizabeth and Martin Weiss
- Principal: Tammy Ferguson
- Grades: Junior PreK-8th Grade
- Enrollment: 305 (May 2021)
- Colors: White and blue
- Athletics: Volleyball, soccer
- Mascot: Wolverines
- Website: www.weissschool.org

The Weiss School is a private school for gifted children in Palm Beach Gardens, Florida, United States, founded in 1989 by Elizabeth and Martin Weiss. It is one of three schools in Southeast Florida exclusively dedicated to educating gifted students.

== Student/School Achievements ==
In 2013 and 2014, one of its students was a finalist at the National Spelling Bee in Washington, D.C.

In 2015, the African Library Project named the Weiss School a 2014 Global Literacy Champion for its hard work and effort in providing for a library at the Letsunyane Primary School in Lesotho.

In 2015, the Miami Dolphins selected a 13-year-old Weiss student to present their first-round NFL draft pick with his jersey after the Weiss student sent the team an electronic resume explaining why the sports organization should hire him.

In 2019, the Weiss School was chosen to represent the United States in the International Space Settlement Competition. The International Competition for it was in September in China, where some of the students of the school flew out to, so they could attend the competition

In 2019, the Weiss School sent their first satellite, the WeissSat-1 into space by NASA. This makes it the first middle school in the United States to send a satellite into space. This satellite tested the resilience of extremophilic bacteria in orbit.
