= Cygnus NG-18 =

2022 American resupply spaceflight to the ISS

NG-18
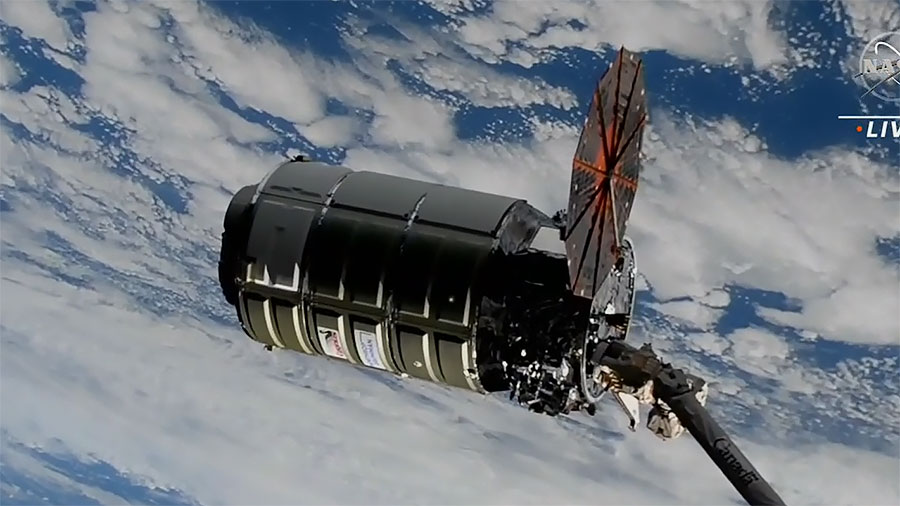
- Cygnus S.S. Sally Ride after arrival at the ISS, with solar panels damaged.
- Names: CRS NG-18
- Mission type: ISS resupply
- Operator: Northrop Grumman
- COSPAR ID: 2022-149A
- SATCAT no.: 54232
- Website: Cygnus NG-18
- Mission duration: 165 days, 16 hours, 39 minutes

Spacecraft properties
- Spacecraft: S.S. Sally Ride
- Spacecraft type: Enhanced Cygnus
- Manufacturer: Northrop Grumman; Thales Alenia Space
- Launch mass: 8,050 kg (17,750 lb)
- Payload mass: 3,749 kg (8,265 lb)

Start of mission
- Launch date: 7 November 2022, 10:32:42 UTC (5:32:42 am EST)
- Rocket: Antares 230+
- Launch site: MARS, Pad 0A

End of mission
- Disposal: Deorbited
- Decay date: 22 April 2023, 03:12 UTC

Orbital parameters
- Reference system: Geocentric orbit
- Regime: Low Earth orbit
- Inclination: 51.66°

Berthing at ISS
- Berthing port: Unity nadir
- RMS capture: 9 November 2022, 10:20 UTC
- Berthing date: 9 November 2022, 13:05 UTC
- Unberthing date: 21 April 2023, 08:37 UTC
- RMS release: 21 April 2023, 11:22 UTC
- Time berthed: 162 days, 19 hours, 32 minutes

Cargo
- Mass: 3,749 kg (8,265 lb)
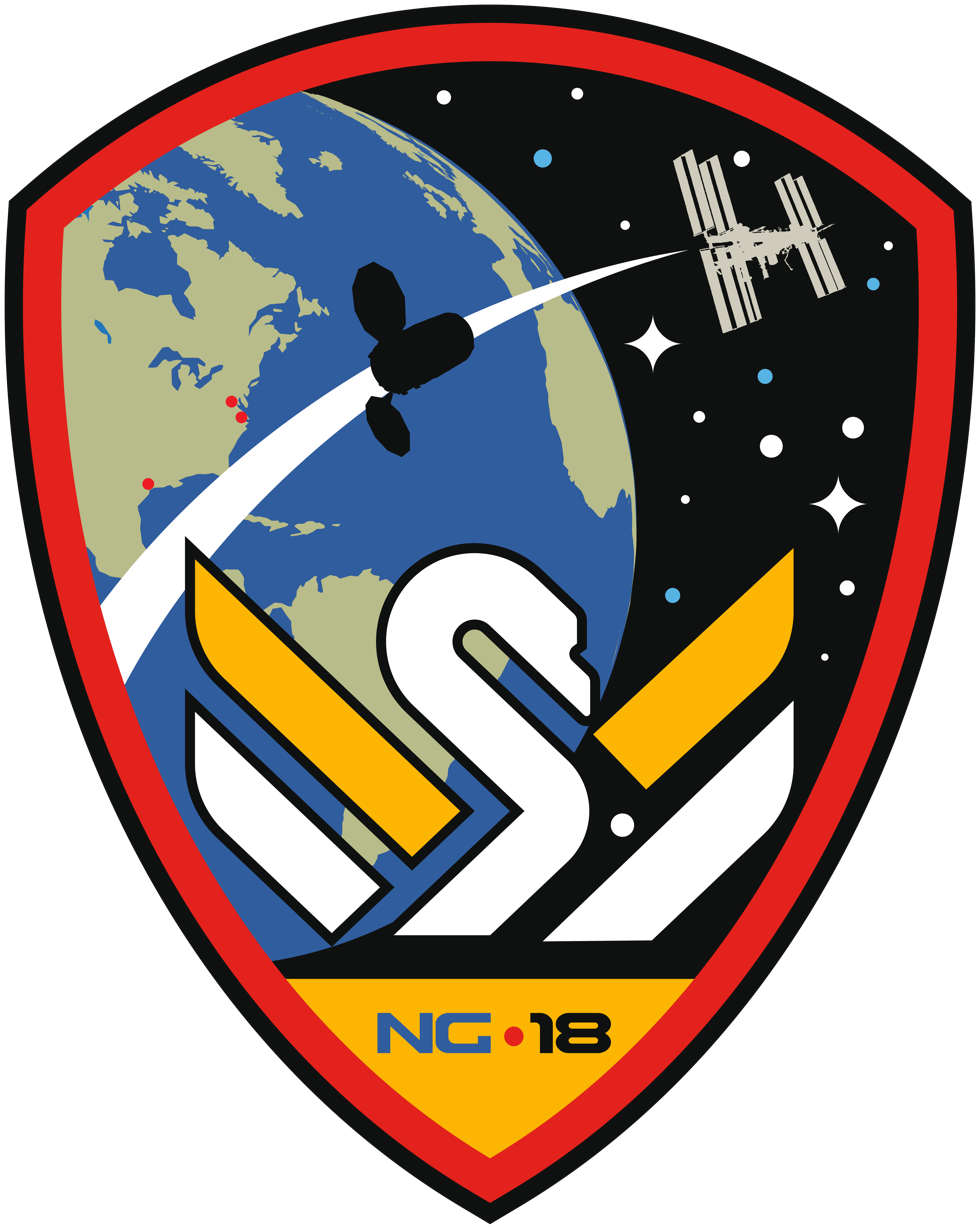
- NASA mission patch Commercial Resupply Services Cygnus flights

NG-18 was the eighteenth flight of the Northrop Grumman robotic resupply spacecraft Cygnus and its seventeenth flight to the International Space Station (ISS) under the Commercial Resupply Services (CRS-2) contract with NASA. The mission successfully launched on 7 November 2022 at 10:32:42 UTC. This was the seventh launch of Cygnus under the CRS-2 contract.

Orbital ATK (now Northrop Grumman Innovation Systems) and NASA jointly developed a new space transportation system to provide commercial cargo resupply services to the International Space Station (ISS). Under the Commercial Orbital Transportation Services (COTS) program, Orbital ATK designed, acquired, built, and assembled these components: Antares, a medium-class launch vehicle; Cygnus, an advanced spacecraft using a Pressurized Cargo Module (PCM) provided by industrial partner Thales Alenia Space and a Service Module based on the Orbital GEOStar satellite bus.

== History ==
Cygnus NG-18 was the seventh Cygnus mission under the Commercial Resupply Services-2 contract. Northrop Grumman Innovation Systems confirmed on 23 February 2021 that Thales Alenia Space of Turin, Italy, will fabricate two additional Pressurized Cargo Modules (PCMs) for a pair of forthcoming Commercial Resupply Services-2 missions. Current plans are for the two additional Cygnus spacecraft to be designated NG-18 and NG-19.

Production and integration of Cygnus spacecraft are performed in Dulles, Virginia. The Cygnus service module is mated with the pressurized cargo module at the launch site, and mission operations are conducted from control centers in Dulles, Virginia and Houston, Texas.

== Spacecraft ==
This was the thirteenth flight of the Enhanced-sized Cygnus PCM.

The vehicle was named the S.S. Sally Ride, after the first American woman in space.

== Flight ==
NG-18 was originally scheduled to launch on 6 November 2022. However, a fire alarm resulted in an evacuation of Northrop Grumman's control center, and the flight was postponed to the next day.

The mission lifted off from the Mid-Atlantic Regional Spaceport on 7 November 2022. About six hours into the flight, NASA announced that one of the two solar arrays failed to deploy. The deploy failure was attributed to acoustic blanket debris being lodged into solar-array mechanisms during a stage separation event.

Northrop Grumman reported that the spacecraft would still be able to reach the ISS. After assessing the situation, NASA determined a rendezvous was safe. The vehicle reached the ISS on November 9.

== Manifest ==
The Cygnus spacecraft is loaded with 3,707 kg (8,173 lb) of research, hardware, and crew supplies.

- Crew supplies: 1,637 kg (3,609 lb)
- Science investigations: 850 kg (1,870 lb)
- Spacewalk equipment: 66 kg (146 lb)
- Vehicle hardware: 1,077 kg (2,374 lb)
- Computer resources: 78 kg (172 lb)

== Research ==
The new experiments arriving at the orbiting laboratory will inspire future scientists and explorers, and provide insight for researchers.

NASA Glenn Research Center studies:

- The Solid Fuel Ignition and Extinction - Material Ignition and Suppression Test (SoFIE-MIST) investigation examines thermally-assisted burning in microgravity, by varying parameters including air flow speed, oxygen concentration, pressure, and level of external radiation.

== See also ==
- Uncrewed spaceflights to the International Space Station
