= Cygnus NG-14 =

2020 American resupply spaceflight to the ISS

NG-14
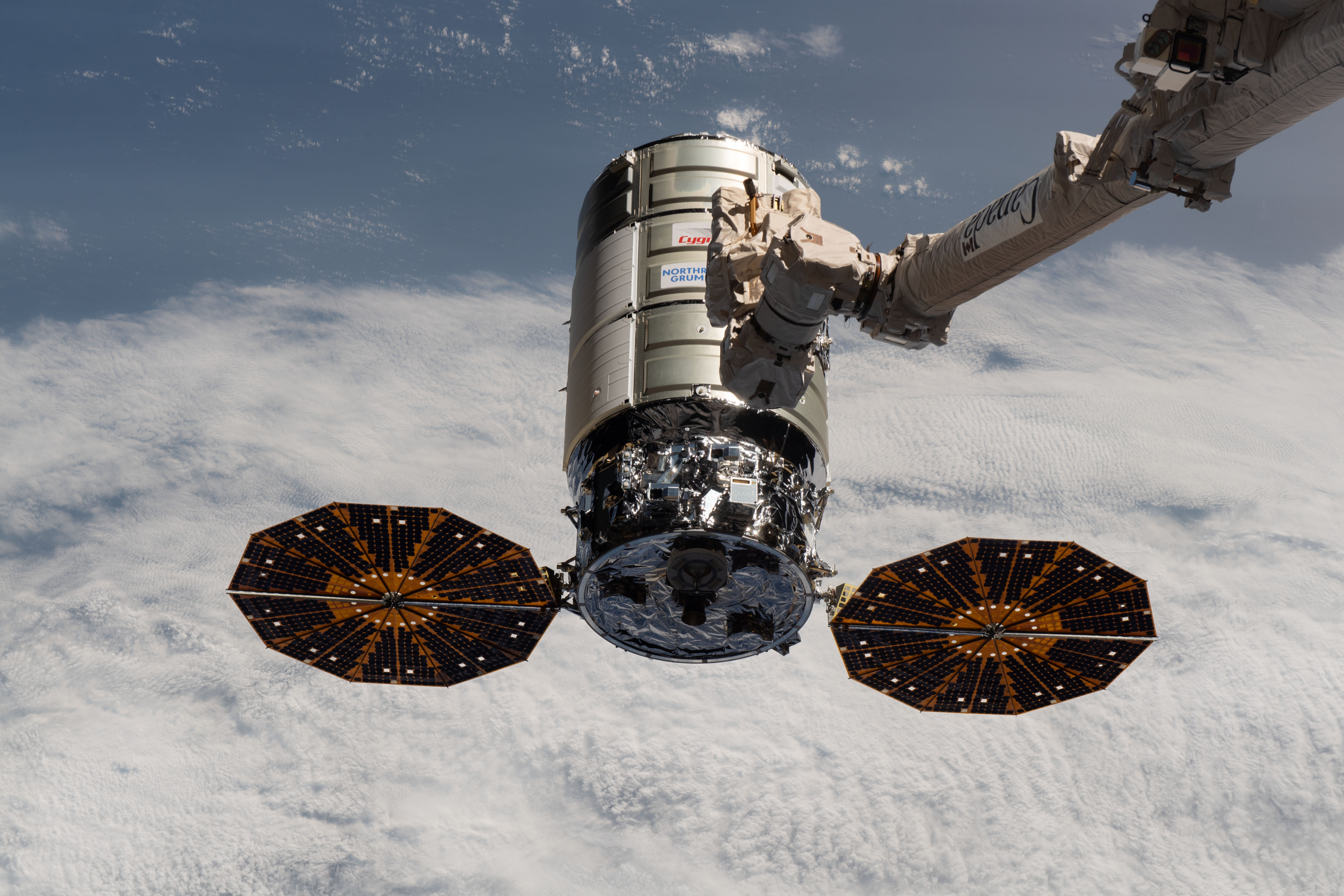
- Canadarm2 approaches the S.S. Kalpana Chawla
- Names: CRS NG-14; CRS OA-14 (2016–2018)
- Mission type: ISS resupply
- Operator: Northrop Grumman
- COSPAR ID: 2020-069A
- SATCAT no.: 46530
- Website: NG-14
- Mission duration: 115 days, 19 hours, 6 minutes

Spacecraft properties
- Spacecraft: S.S. Kalpana Chawla
- Spacecraft type: Enhanced Cygnus
- Manufacturer: Northrop Grumman; Thales Alenia Space
- Launch mass: 7,919 kg (17,458 lb)
- Payload mass: 3,551 kg (7,829 lb)

Start of mission
- Launch date: 3 October 2020, 01:16:14 UTC (9:16:14 pm EDT)
- Rocket: Antares 230+
- Launch site: MARS, Pad 0A

End of mission
- Disposal: Deorbited
- Decay date: 26 January 2021, 20:23 UTC

Orbital parameters
- Reference system: Geocentric orbit
- Regime: Low Earth orbit
- Inclination: 51.66°

Berthing at ISS
- Berthing port: Unity nadir
- RMS capture: 5 October 2020, 09:32 UTC
- Berthing date: 5 October 2020, 12:01 UTC
- Unberthing date: 6 January 2021, 12:15 UTC
- RMS release: 6 January 2021, 15:11 UTC
- Time berthed: 93 days, 14 minutes
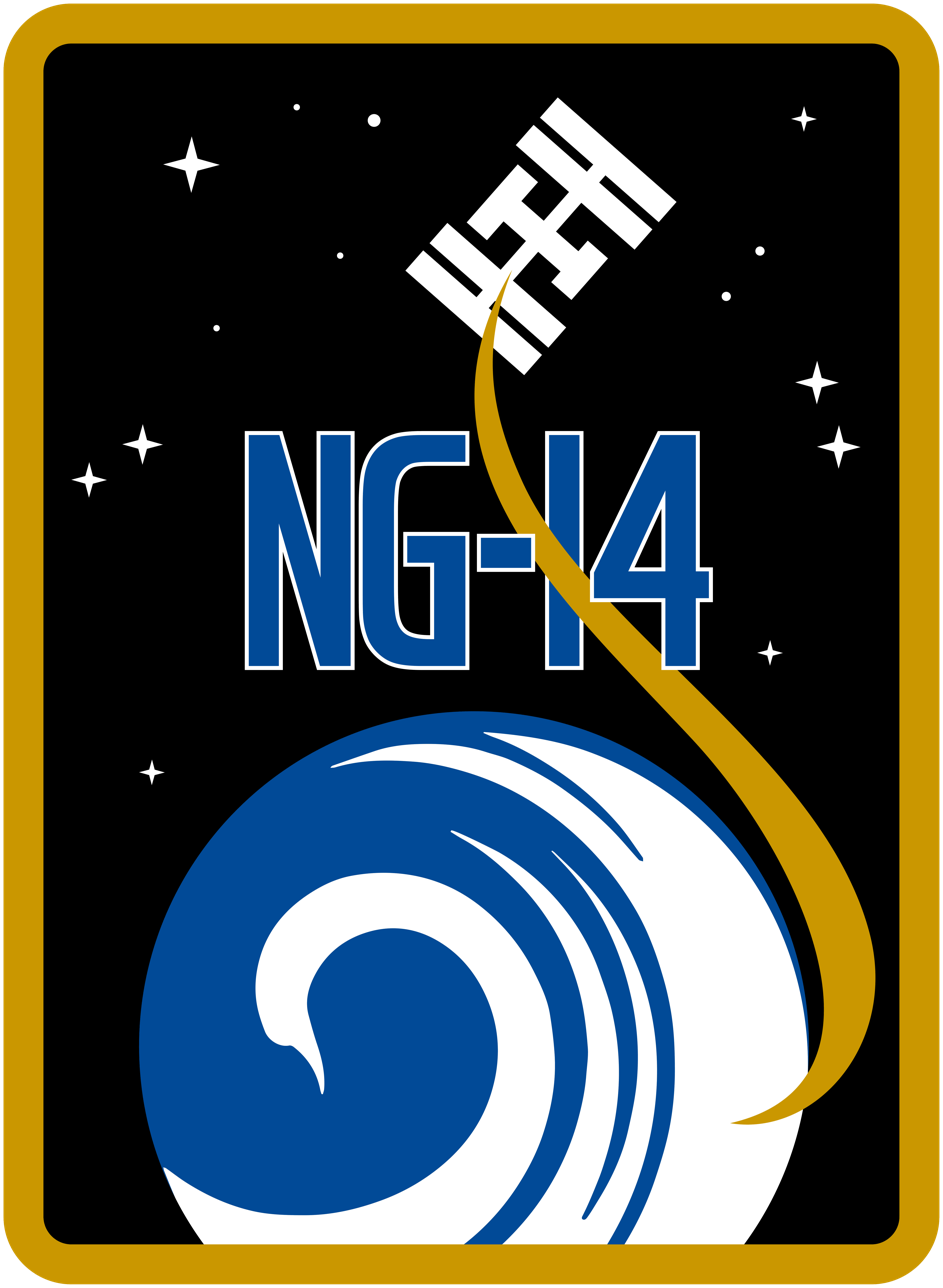
- NASA insignia Commercial Resupply Services Cygnus flights

NG-14, previously known as OA-14, was the fifteenth flight of the Northrop Grumman robotic resupply spacecraft Cygnus and its fourteenth flight to the International Space Station under the Commercial Resupply Services (CRS-1) contract with NASA. The mission was launched on 3 October 2020, at 01:16:14 UTC.

Orbital ATK (now Northrop Grumman Innovation Systems) and NASA jointly developed a new space transportation system to provide commercial cargo resupply services to the International Space Station (ISS). Under the Commercial Orbital Transportation Services (COTS) program, Orbital ATK designed, acquired, built, and assembled these components: Antares, a medium-class launch vehicle; Cygnus, an advanced spacecraft using a Pressurized Cargo Module (PCM) provided by industrial partner Thales Alenia Space, Turin, Italy and a Service Module based on the Orbital Sciences' (headquartered at Dulles, Virginia) GEOStar satellite bus.

== History ==
Cygnus NG-14 was the third Cygnus mission under the Commercial Resupply Services-2 (CRS-2) contract. Production and integration of Cygnus spacecraft are performed in Dulles, Virginia. The Cygnus service module is mated with the pressurized cargo module at the launch site, and mission operations are conducted from control centers in Dulles, Virginia and Houston, Texas.

== Spacecraft ==
This was the ninth flight of the Enhanced Cygnus. The NG-14 Cygnus was named the "S.S. Kalpana Chawla", in memory of the NASA mission specialist who died with her six crewmates aboard the Space Shuttle Columbia (STS-107) in 2003. "It is the company's tradition to name each Cygnus after an individual who has played a pivotal role in human spaceflight", Northrop Grumman said in a statement released on 8 September 2020. "Chawla was selected in honor of her prominent place in history as the first woman of Indian descent to go to space".

== Manifest ==
Cygnus NG-14 cargo loading began on 9 September 2020 with the NASA Glenn Research Center SAFFIRE V experiment module. The initial cargo load began two days later. Mating of Cygnus with the Antares launch vehicle occurred about a week later, with "Late Cargo Load" items on 22 September 2020. The bullet-like payload fairing was installed atop Antares on 23 September 2020. The ISS National Laboratory, created a three-minute video to highlight the payloads being launched to ISS via the Cygnus NG-14 mission.

The Cygnus NG-14 spacecraft was the second heaviest cargo mission to date, loaded with 3,551 kg (7,829 lb) of research, hardware, and crew supplies:

- Crew supplies: 850 kg (1,870 lb)
- Science investigations: 1,217 kg (2,683 lb)
- Spacewalk equipment: 151 kg (333 lb)
- Vehicle hardware: 1,230 kg (2,710 lb)
- Computer resources: 71 kg (157 lb)

Two nitrogen tanks were added to this Cygnus manifest. These tanks help maintain the nitrogen component of the ISS air mixture, necessary due to a recent increase in air leakage.

== Hardware ==
Felix & Paul Studios EVA Camera was the world's first space-rated 3D-390° virtual reality (VR) camera. The camera was designed to shoot footage for Space Explorers: The ISS Experience, a collaboration between Montreal-based Felix & Paul Studios, Time, and Nanoracks. U.S. space services company Nanoracks ruggedized the camera to survive the harsh environment of space and meet NASA requirements. NASA Astronauts will mount the camera on the Nanoracks Kaber Microsatellite Deployer inside the International Space Station (ISS) before deploying it outside to capture footage of the Earth, the ISS, and spacewalking astronauts in 8K VR for the first time.

Universal Waste Management System, a US$23 million titanium upgraded toilet, allowing astronauts to test its functionality before a similar commode flies on the Orion crew capsule to the Moon. The new toilet is roughly the size of a camper commode. It is about 65% smaller and 40% lighter than the toilet currently on the space station, according to Melissa McKinley, logistics reduction manager for the advanced exploration systems division of NASA. NASA partnered with Collins Aerospace to develop the new toilet, which officials said is better suited for female crew members than the existing commode on the station. Engineers made parts of the toilet out of titanium to withstand acid used to pre-treat urine before the fluid is recycled back into drinking water for the astronauts, said Jim Fuller, project manager of the toilet at Collins Aerospace.

== Research ==
ELaNa 31, Educational Launch of Nanosatellites, deployed the following CubeSats from ISS: Bobcat-1, NEUTRON-1, and SPOC.

Multi-Needle Langmuir Probe (m-NLP) instrument from the University of Oslo and the Norwegian company Eidsvoll Electronics to measure ionospheric plasma densities. With its relatively low orbit, the International Space Station (ISS) passes near the peak plasma density of the ionosphere. The m-NLP is currently the only instrument in existence capable of resolving ionospheric plasma density variations at spatial scales below one-meter. m-NLP will be the first payload to be installed on the Bartolomeo platform outside the European Columbus module.

SAFFIRE V, the Spacecraft Fire Experiment, flying its fifth (and second-to-last) mission, provided by NASA's Glenn Research Center (GRC) in Cleveland, Ohio, safely examined the process of combustion, smoke behavior and flame-spreading in the microgravity environment. The last two SAFFIREs were planned to run at much lower pressures of around 8.2 psi and a 34% oxygen level. These represent significantly higher atmospheric conditions than are found here on Earth, which was expected to increase the energetic vigor of their respective flames. The first SAFFIRE experiment failed to ignite as planned, and the second returned an anomalous temperature spike reading from one of its thermocouples. David L. Urban, Ph.D. of the NASA Glenn Research Center in Cleveland, Ohio is the principal investigator for this experiment series.

Advanced Night Repair, the cosmetics company Estée Lauder flew 10 bottles of its "Advanced Night Repair" serum to the ISS, where the bottles will be photographed with Earth as a backdrop. Estée Lauder says it will use the images in social media and marketing campaigns, and then plans to auction the serum returned to Earth, with the proceeds going to charity. It is part of a new NASA program that dedicates 5% of space station cargo capacity and crew time to commercial marketing activities. Estée Lauder will reimburse NASA around US$128,000 for the resources used in the night serum marketing initiative, according to Phil McAlister, director of commercial spaceflight development of NASA.

SharkSat, a Northrop Grumman technology experiment mounted to the S.S. Kalpana Chawla. According to a NASA fact sheet, SharkSat will remain attached to the Cygnus spacecraft to demonstrate a Ka-band Software Defined Radio (SDR) system, which have applications in 5G telecommunications, satellite communications, radar, and autonomous and cognitive systems, according to NASA.

== Gallery ==
Cygnus NG-14
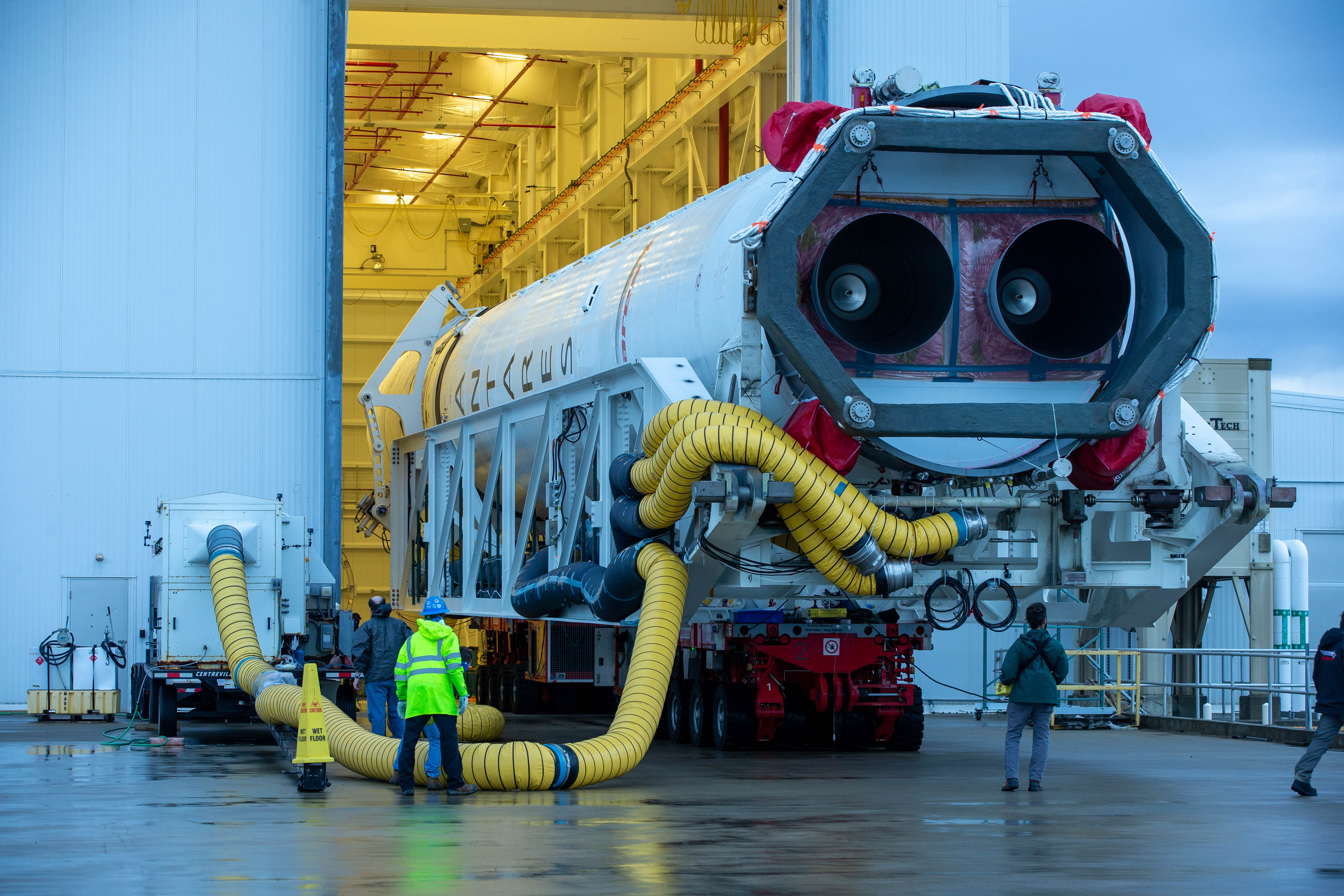
Antares rolling to the pad

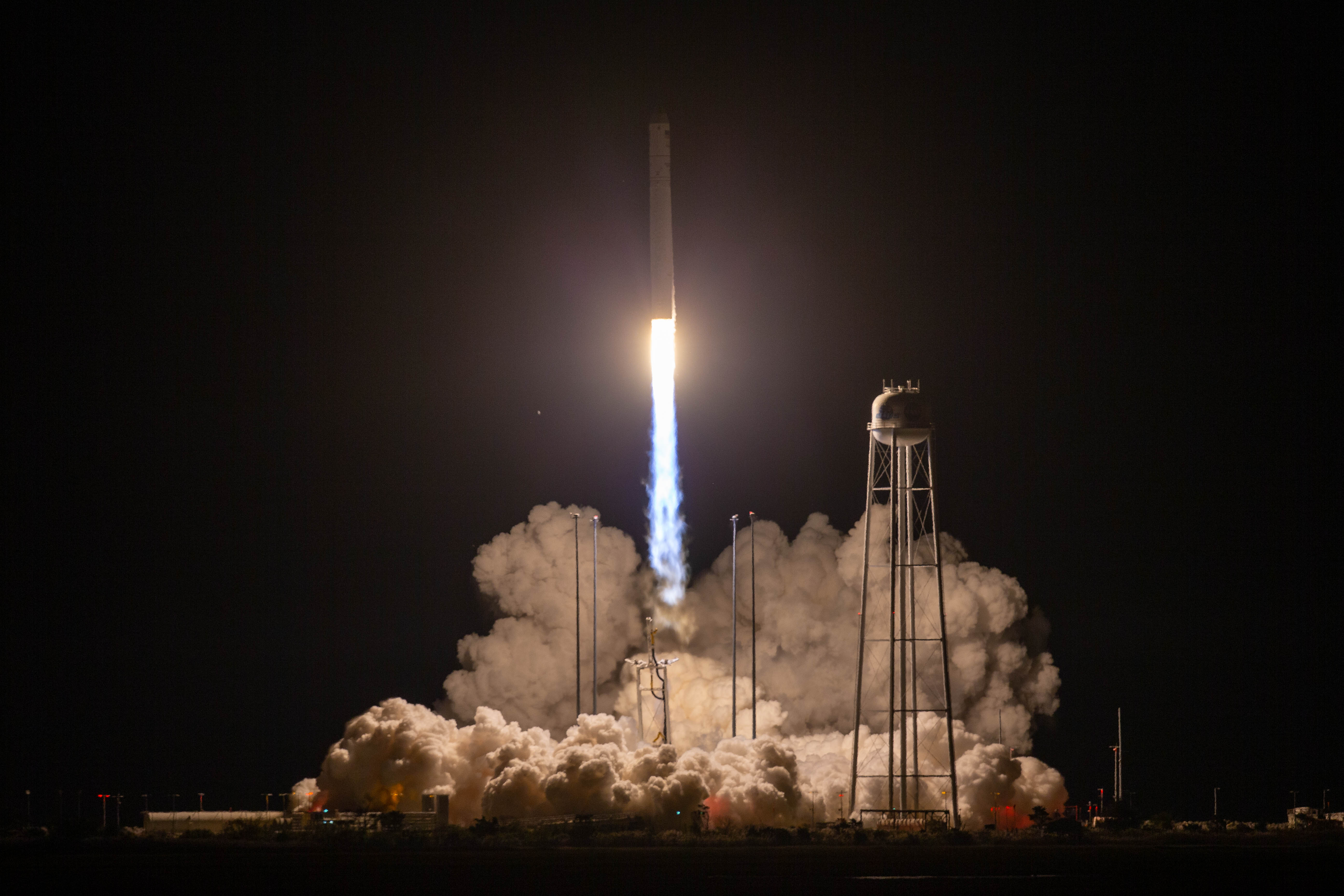
Launch of Cygnus NG-14

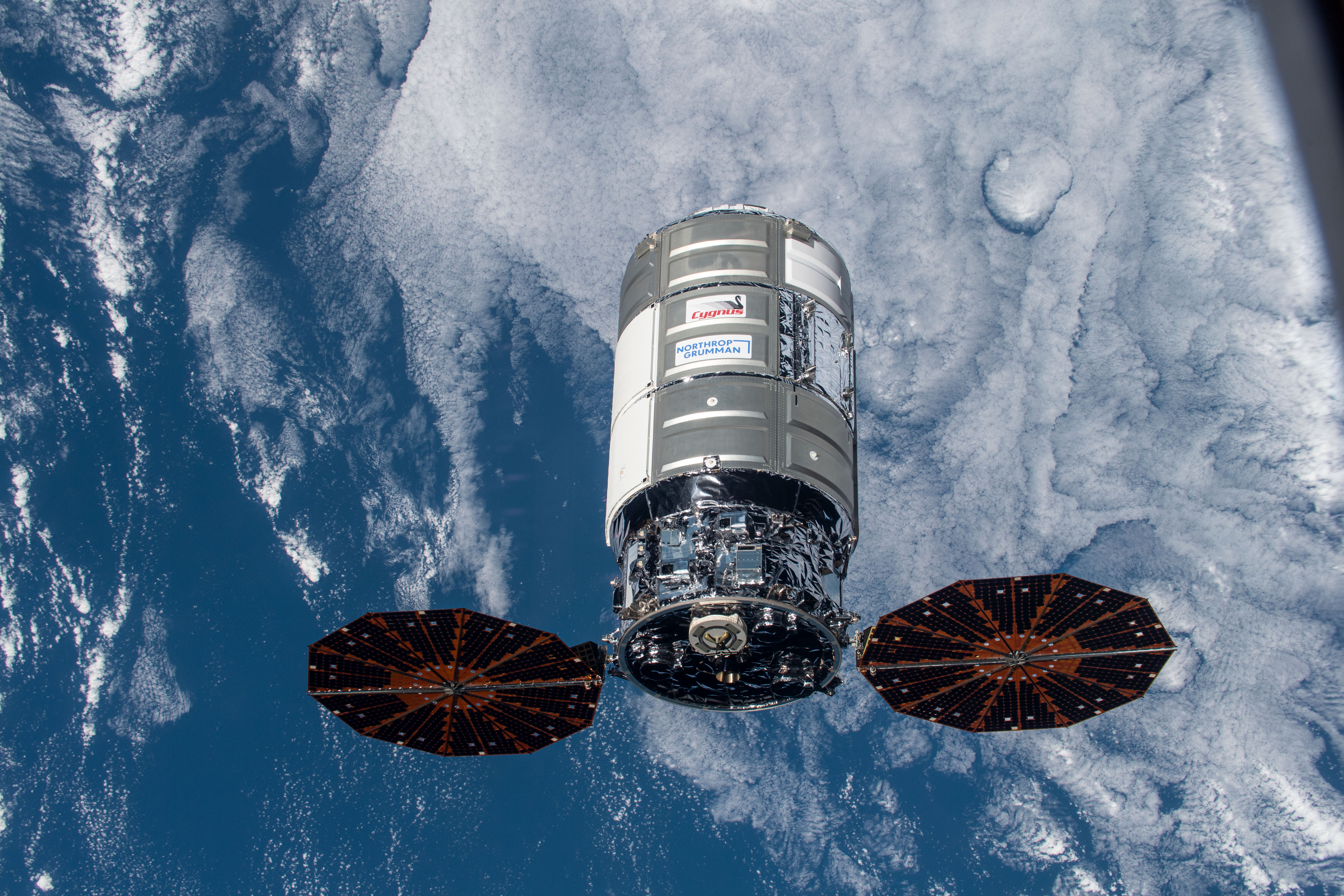
Cygnus approaching the ISS

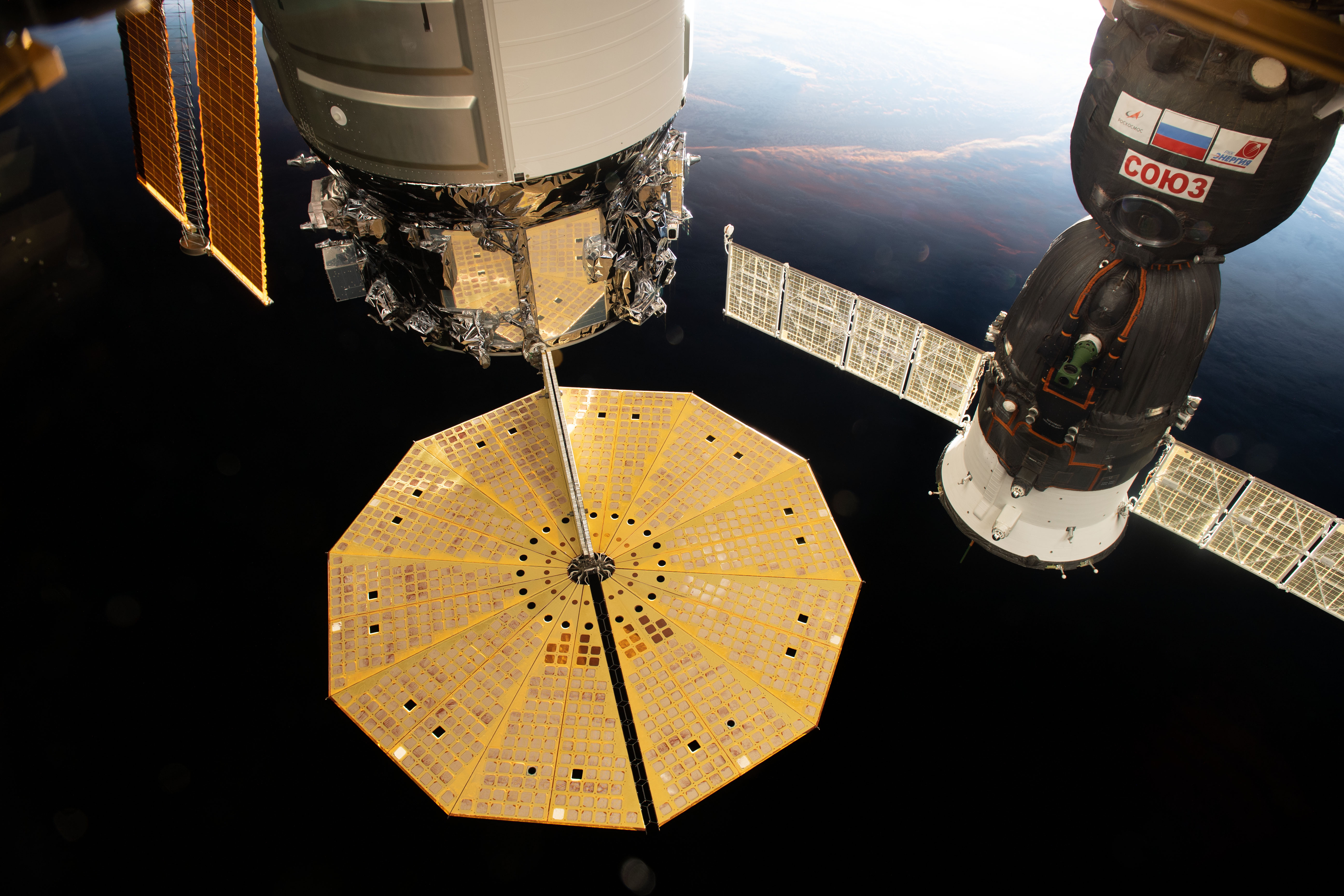
Cygnus berthed to the ISS

== See also ==
- Uncrewed spaceflights to the International Space Station
