= USA-231 =

American reconnaissance satellite

ORS-1
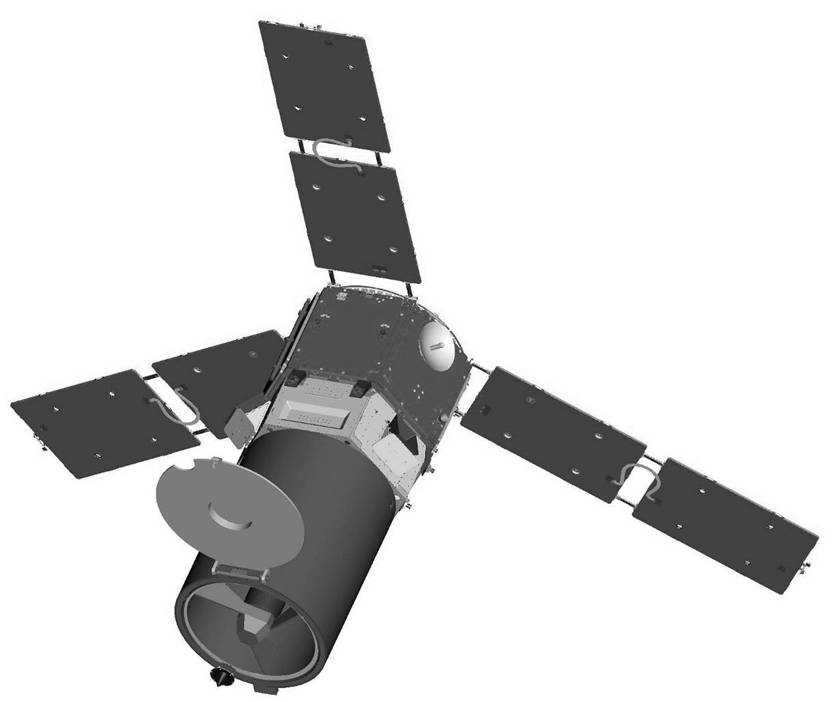
- Illustration of the ORS-1 satellite
- Mission type: Imaging
- Operator: US DoD
- COSPAR ID: 2011-029A
- SATCAT no.: 37728

Spacecraft properties
- Bus: ATK satellite bus
- Manufacturer: Goodrich Corporation
- Launch mass: 434 kilograms (957 lb)

Start of mission
- Launch date: June 30, 2011, 03:09 UTC
- Rocket: Minotaur I
- Launch site: Mid-Atlantic Regional Spaceport LP-0B
- Contractor: Orbital Sciences

Orbital parameters
- Reference system: Geocentric
- Regime: Low Earth
- Perigee altitude: 423 kilometers (263 mi)
- Apogee altitude: 427 kilometers (265 mi)
- Inclination: 40.07 degrees
- Period: 92.93 minutes
- Epoch: January 13, 2015, 04:45:04 UTC

USA-231 or ORS-1 (Operationally Responsive Space-1) is an American reconnaissance satellite which was launched in 2011 from NASA’s Wallops Flight Facility, Virginia by a Minotaur I launch vehicle. It is the first operational satellite of the Operationally Responsive Space Office. It is equipped with a SYERS 2A sensor.

ORS-1 satellite is designed to provide orbital space imagery of Southwest Asia and to enhance battlespace awareness to operational field commanders. The ORS-1 will undergo a 30-day trial and adjustment check before the ORS Office turns over it operations to USAF's 1st Space Operations Squadron at Schriever AFB, Colorado.

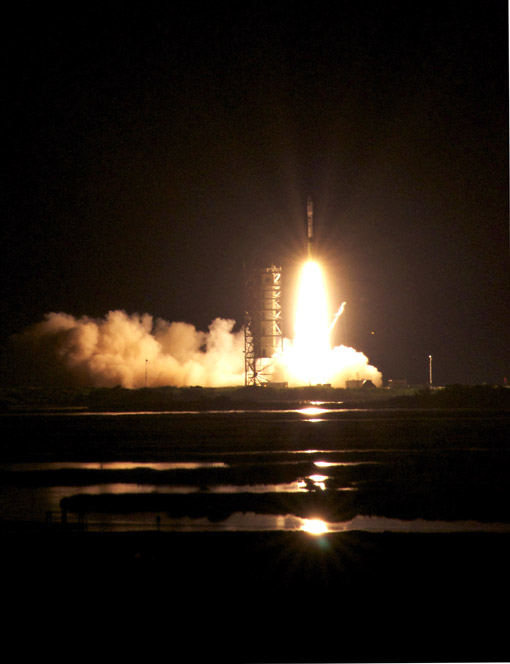
Minotaur I Rocket Launch at NASA Wallops, June 30, 2011 with ORS-1

== SYERS ==
SYERS 2 is an optical and infrared camera with a 40 cm aperture and a field of view larger than 2 degrees. It uses time delay and integration CCD sensors to compensate for ground motion, resulting in a resolution of 1m (NIIRS 4) from a nominal 300 km orbit. SYERS 2 is supplied by the Goodrich Corporation.

SYERS is also carried by the Lockheed U-2 reconnaissance aircraft.

== See also ==
- 2011 in spaceflight
