= ALV X-1 =

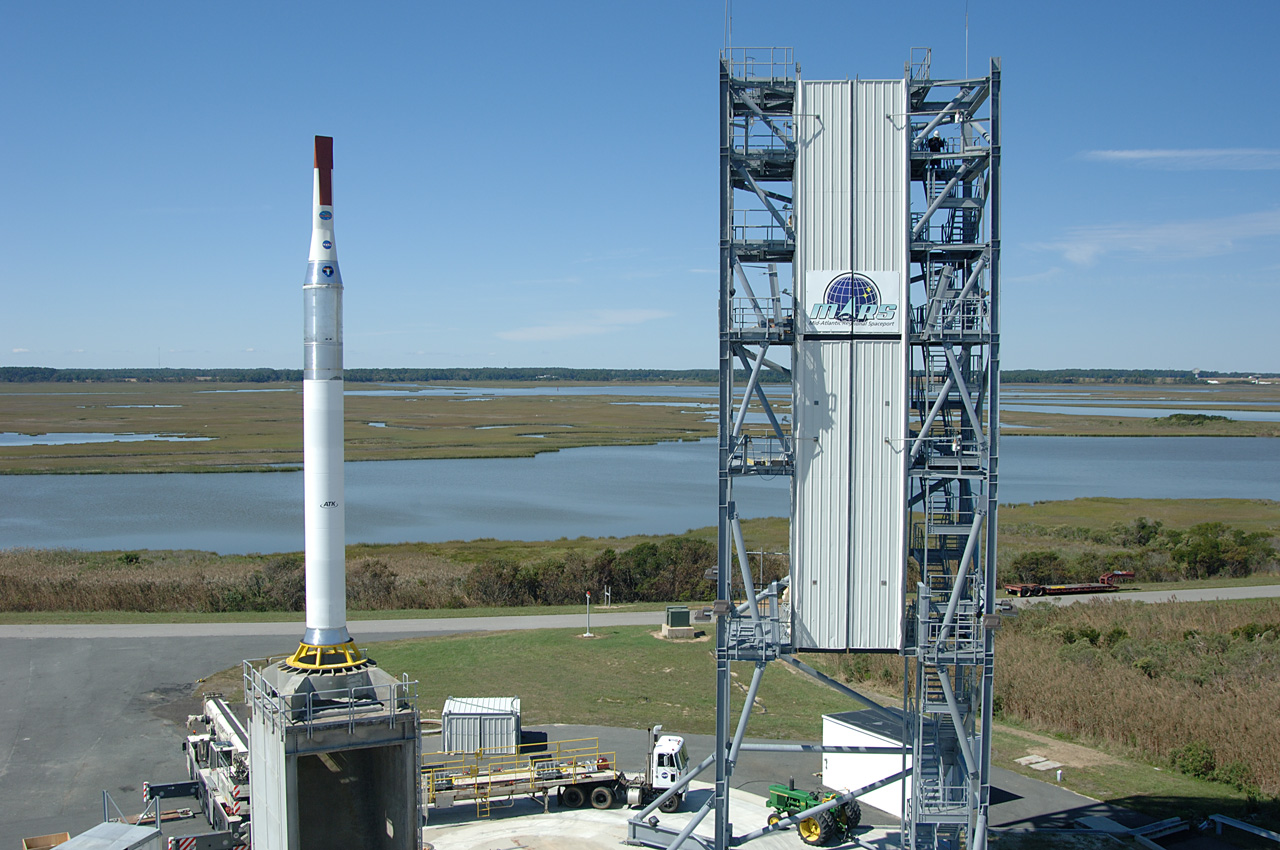
- ATK ALV X-1 Launch Vehicle Pathfinder
- Function: Sub-Orbital Test Vehicle
- Manufacturer: Alliant Techsystems
- Country of origin: United States

Size
- Height: 54 feet (16 m)
- Diameter: 5 feet (1.5 m)
- Mass: Unknown
- Stages: 2

Launch history
- Status: Inactive
- Launch sites: Mid-Atlantic Regional Spaceport
- Total launches: 1
- Failure(s): 1

ALV X-1 was the first and only flight of the ATK Launch Vehicle (ALV) sounding rocket developed by Alliant Techsystems. The launch occurred from LP-0B at the Mid-Atlantic Regional Spaceport (MARS) at NASA's Wallops Flight Facility. This mission carried the SOAREX-VI and Hy-BoLT experiments as payloads when it launched at 09:10 GMT on August 22, 2008. The vehicle was terminated 20 seconds into flight after veering too far off course.

== Hy-BoLT ==
The Hypersonic Boundary Layer Transition (Hy-BoLT) experiment payload was sponsored by the Hypersonics Project within the Fundamental Aeronautics Program of NASA. Hy-BoLT was a wedge-shaped payload that would have provided "valuable data on the fundamental physics of high-Mach flight." It would have been launched to an altitude of 250 miles (400 km), transmitting various temperatures and pressures on different parts of the vehicle's surface.

During the flight, Hy-BoLT transmitted data as expected for the first 20 seconds until it was destroyed when the rocket was detonated.

== SOAREX-VI ==
Sub-Orbital Aerodynamic Re-entry EXperiments VI (SOAREX-VI) was sponsored by the Hypersonics Project within the Fundamental Aeronautics Program of NASA, and developed by NASA's Ames Research Center. It was carried by the ALV X-1 as a secondary payload. SOAREX-VI would have attempted to characterize an innovative self-orienting reentry vehicle shape called the Slotted Compression RAMP (SCRAMP) probe. The SOAREX-VI package also included an atmospheric density calibration probe built by NASA Ames in cooperation with the University of Idaho, and an AIS probe built by the United States Naval Research Laboratory (NRL).

After detonation of the rocket, the SOAREX-VI enclosure inside was broken open. The SCRAMP probe, designed to activate upon ejection, did exactly that and acquired two TDRSS satellites overhead and an S-band tracking dish on land. It transmitted sensor and video data until it was destroyed on splashdown.

== See also ==
- Boeing X-51
- Force Application and Launch from Continental United States
- HyShot
- NASA X-43
- Operationally Responsive Space Office
