= Cygnus Orb-2 =

Mid-2014 cargo mission to the ISS

Orbital-2
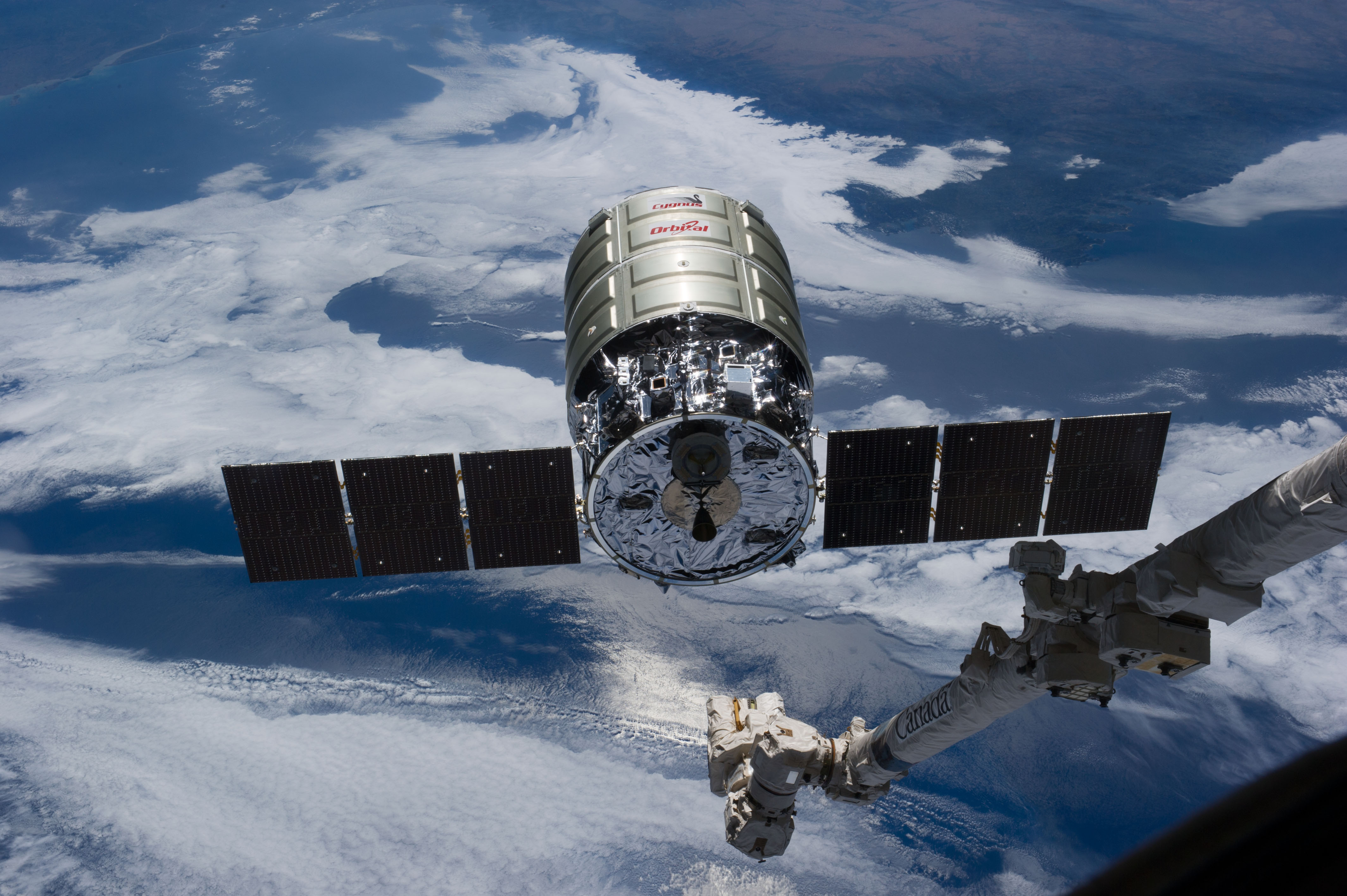
- Canadarm2 approaches the S.S. Janice Voss
- Names: CRS Orb-2
- Mission type: ISS resupply
- Operator: Orbital Sciences Corporation
- COSPAR ID: 2014-039A
- SATCAT no.: 40084
- Mission duration: 34 days, 20 hours, 29 minutes

Spacecraft properties
- Spacecraft: S.S. Janice Voss
- Spacecraft type: Standard Cygnus
- Manufacturer: Orbital Sciences Corporation; Thales Alenia Space
- Launch mass: 5,644 kg (12,443 lb)
- Payload mass: 1,494 kg (3,294 lb)

Start of mission
- Launch date: 13 July 2014, 16:52:14 UTC (12:52:14 pm EDT)
- Rocket: Antares 120
- Launch site: MARS, Pad 0A

End of mission
- Disposal: Deorbited
- Decay date: 17 August 2014, 13:22 UTC

Orbital parameters
- Reference system: Geocentric orbit
- Regime: Low Earth orbit
- Inclination: 51.64°

Berthing at ISS
- Berthing port: Harmony nadir
- RMS capture: 16 July 2014, 10:36 UTC
- Berthing date: 16 July 2014, 12:53 UTC
- Unberthing date: 15 August 2014, 09:14 UTC
- RMS release: 15 August 2014, 10:40 UTC
- Time berthed: 29 days, 20 hours, 21 minutes
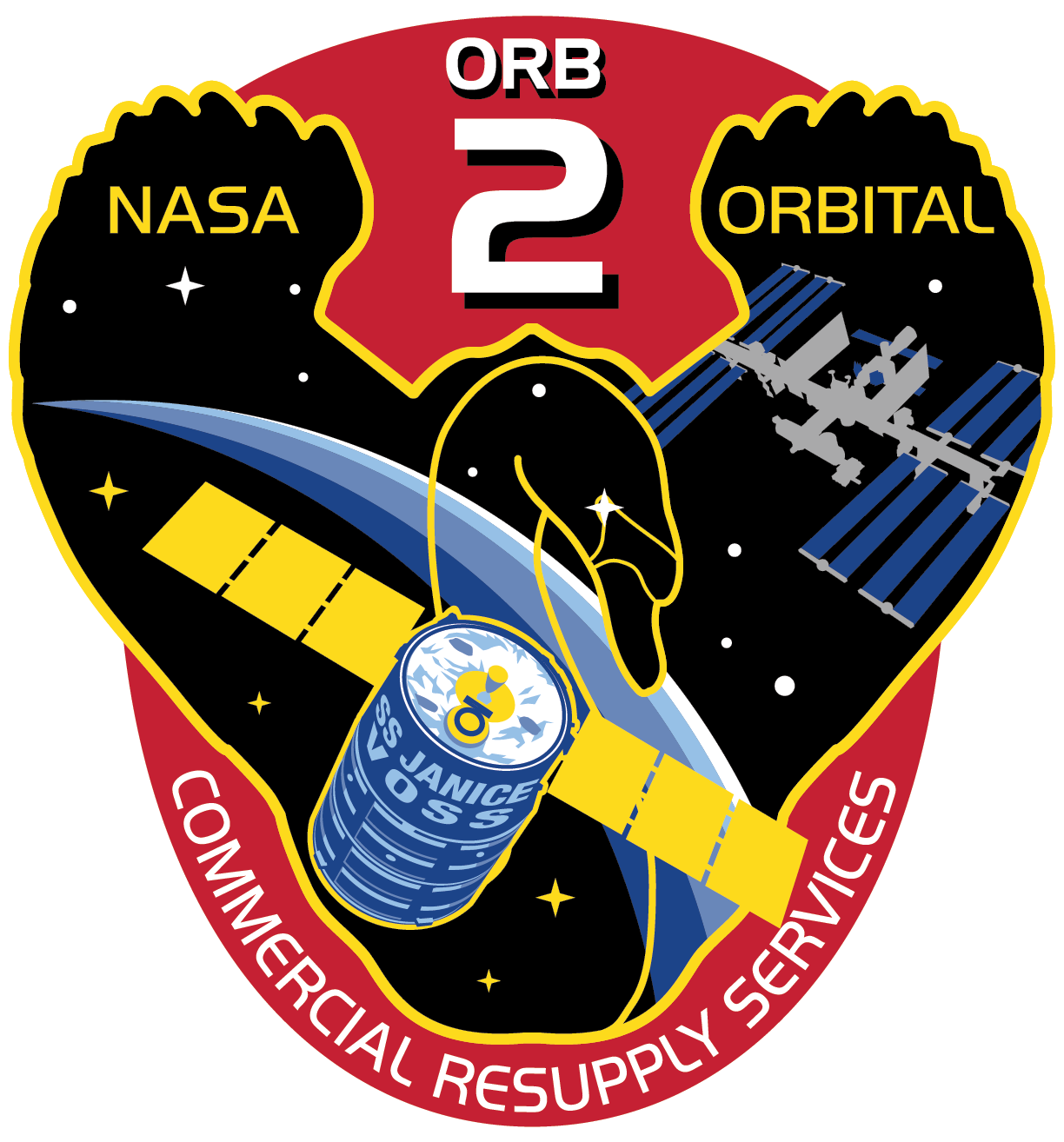
- NASA insignia Commercial Resupply Services Cygnus flights

Orbital-2, also known as Orb-2, was the third flight of the Orbital Sciences' uncrewed resupply spacecraft Cygnus, its third flight to the International Space Station, and the fourth launch of the company's Antares launch vehicle. The mission launched from the Mid-Atlantic Regional Spaceport (MARS) on 13 July 2014 at 16:52:14 UTC.

== Spacecraft ==
This was the second of eight scheduled flights by Orbital Sciences under the Commercial Resupply Services (CRS-1) contract with NASA. It was the last planned usage of the enhanced Castor 30B second stage for this CRS Orb-x series.

In an Orbital Sciences tradition, the Cygnus spacecraft was named the S.S. Janice Voss after Janice E. Voss, a NASA astronaut and Orbital employee who died on 6 February 2012.

== Launch and early operations ==
The mission was originally scheduled to launch on 1 May 2014 but the launch was delayed to 6 May 2014, then to 17 June 2014, then to 1 July 2014, again to 10 July 2014, again to 11 July 2014 due to test stand failure of an AJ-26 engine, to 12 July 2014 due to weather, and finally to 13 July 2014, again due to weather. Orb-2 launched on 13 July 2014 at 16:52:14 UTC with berthing to the ISS following 3 days later on 16 July 2014. The Cygnus Orb-2 delivered 1,650 kg (3,640 lb) of cargo to ISS and disposed of about 1,470 kg (3,240 lb) of trash through destructive reentry.

== Mission highlights ==
- Flight Day 1 (launch): after a 10-minute flight sequence, Antares launched Cygnus into orbit on the same plane as the International Space Station, but significantly below it. Cygnus then deployed its solar arrays after separation from Antares. After a series of checks, ground controllers commanded Cygnus to begin increasing its altitude.
- Flight Days 2 and 3: Cygnus continued to increase its altitude to match that of the space station.
- Flight Day 4: NASA made a go/no-go decision for Cygnus to berth with the station whereupon Cygnus first autonomously approached within 12 m (39 ft) below the space station, where it stopped and held position. Astronauts aboard the station then commanded Cygnus to a "free drift" mode, where they captured it with the station's robotic arm attached to the station's nadir node.
- Flight Day 5 to Day 36: ISS Astronauts opened Cygnus' hatch, unloaded the payload and filled it with cargo for disposal.
- Flight Day 36 through Day 41 Cygnus was detached from the station and maneuvered a safe distance away. Engineering tests were conducted for 2 days before a series of engine burns were conducted to slow the spacecraft for reentry over the South Pacific Ocean, where it and the cargo inside were destroyed.

== Manifest ==
Total weight of cargo: 1,650 kg (3,640 lb)

- Crew supplies: 764 kg (1,684 lb)
  - Crew care packages
  - Crew provisions
  - Food
- Hardware: 355 kg (783 lb)
  - Crew health care system hardware
  - Environment control and life-support equipment
  - Electrical power system hardware
  - Extravehicular robotics equipment
  - Flight crew equipment
  - PL facility
  - Structural and mechanical equipment
  - Internal thermal control system hardware
- Science and research: 327 kg (721 lb)
  - CubeSats and deployers
  - Japan Aerospace Exploration Agency dynamic surf hardware
  - Human research program resupply
- Computer supplies: 8.2 kg (18 lb)
  - Command and data handling
  - Photo and TV equipment
- Spacewalk tools: 39 kg (86 lb)

== Images ==
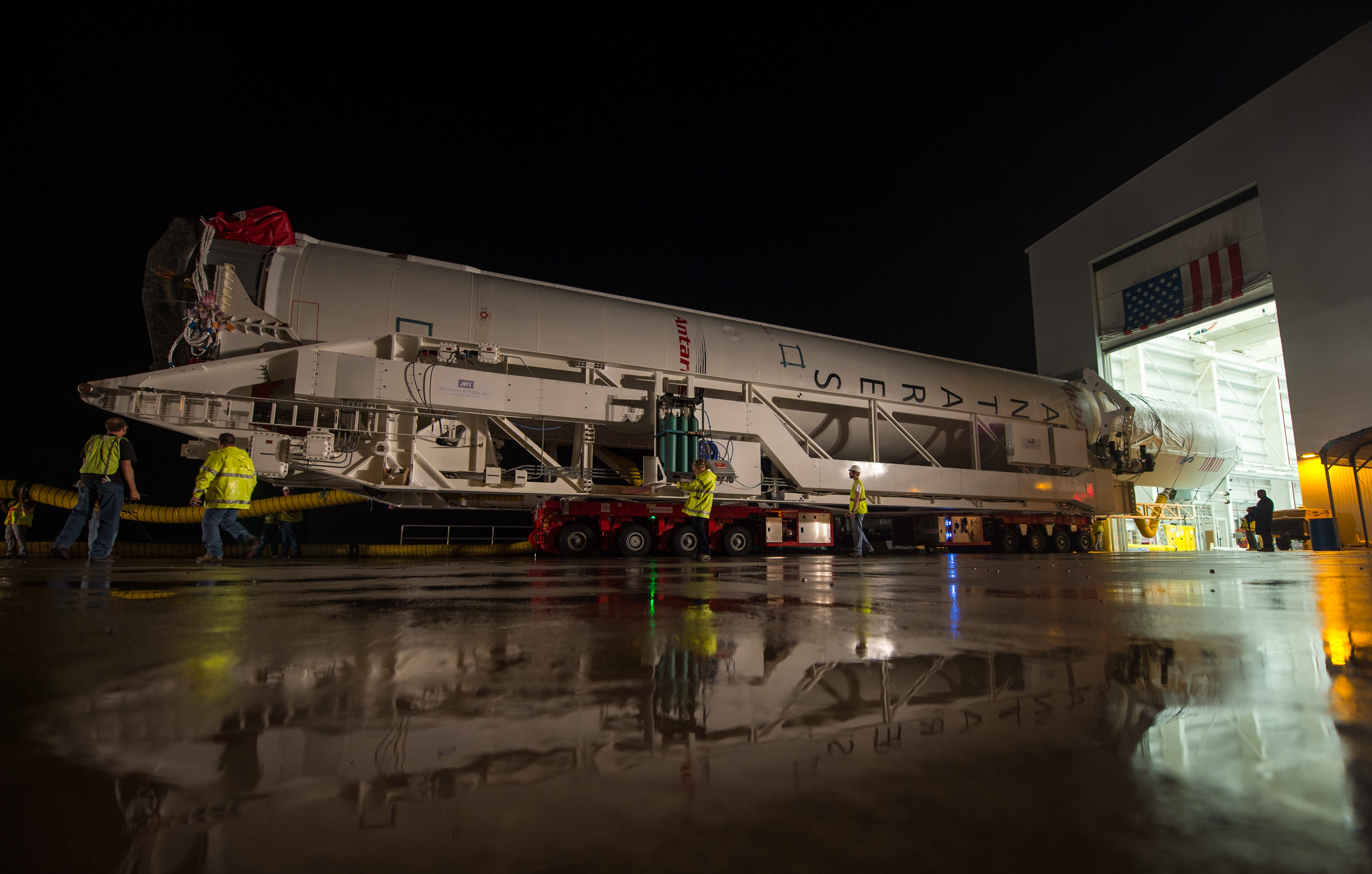
Night rollout from the Horizontal Integration Facility (HIF).

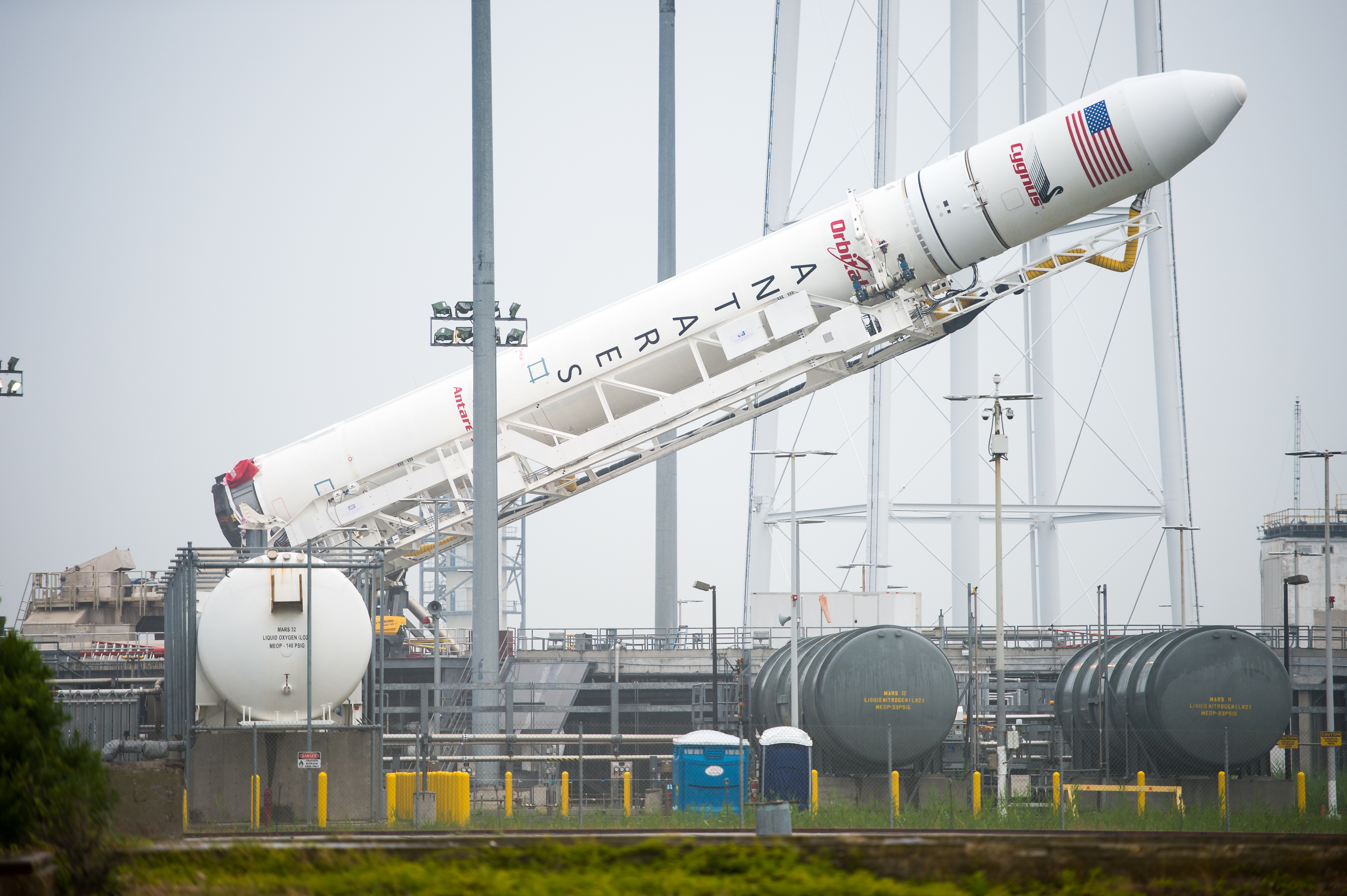
Raising of the rocket into launch position.

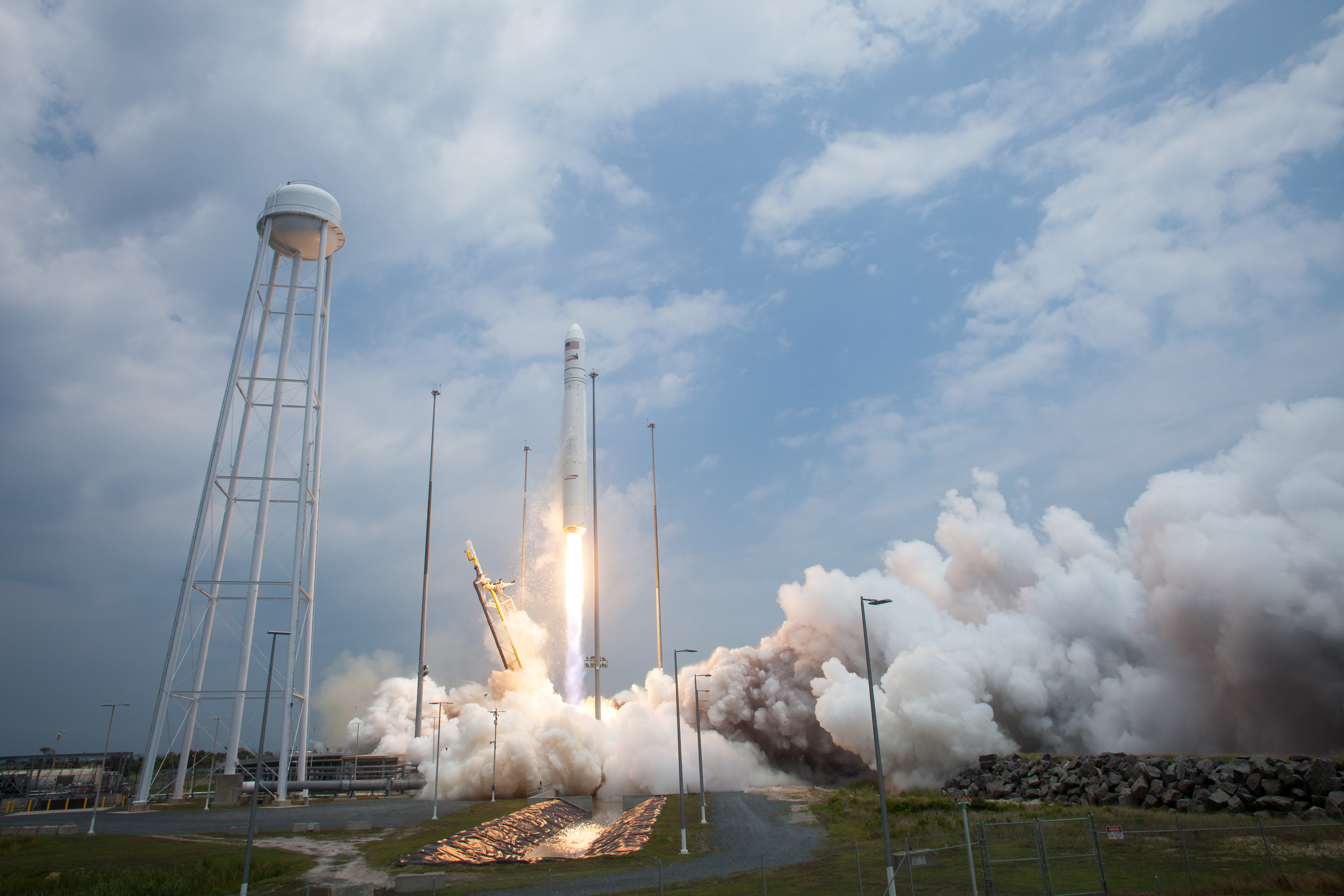
The Antares launch vehicle clears the TEL at liftoff.

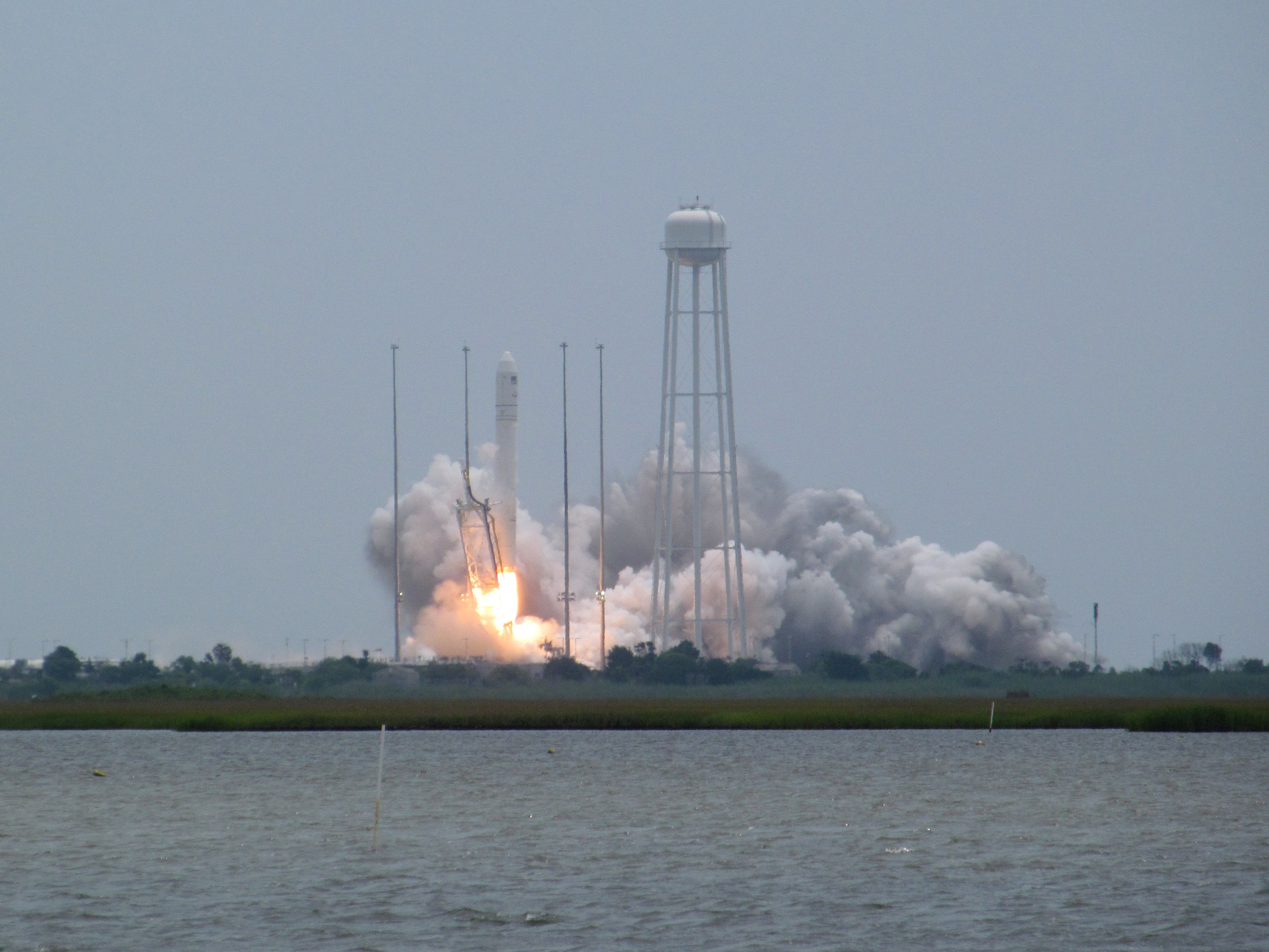
The launch as seen from a viewing site.

== See also ==
- Uncrewed spaceflights to the International Space Station
