= Eclipse (rocket) =

Rocket under development by Firefly Aerospace and Northrop Grumman

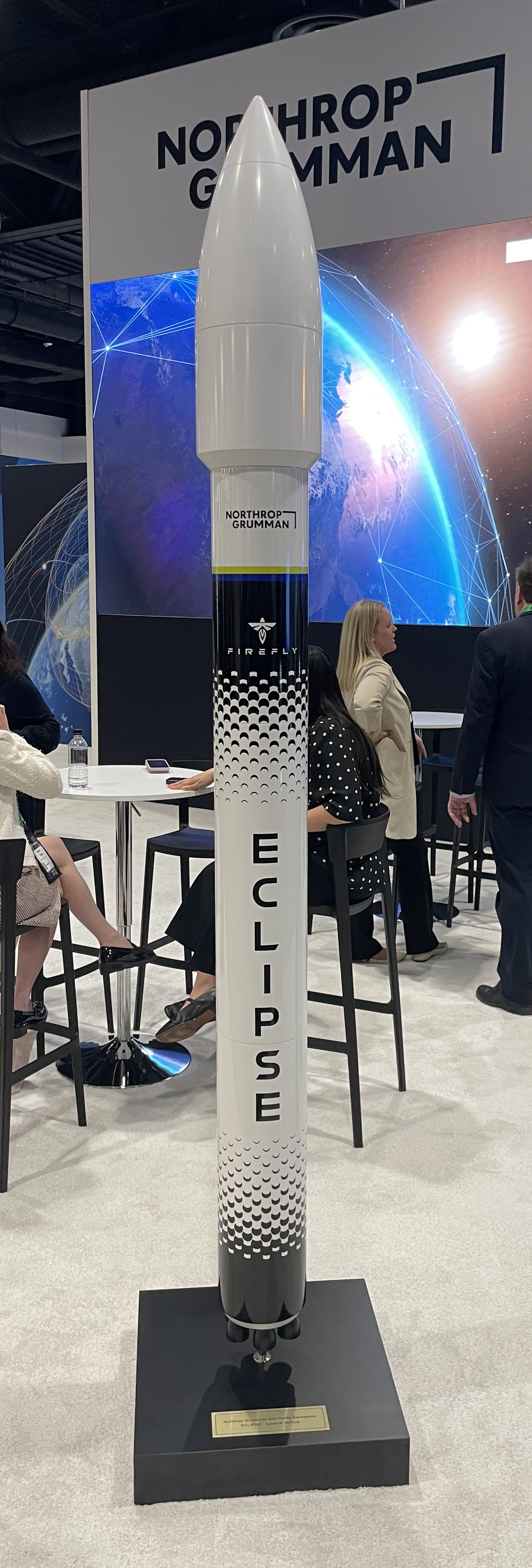
- Eclipse model
- Function: Medium-lift launch vehicle
- Manufacturer: Firefly Aerospace; Northrop Grumman
- Country of origin: United States

Size
- Height: ~58.5 m (192 ft)
- Diameter: 4.32 m (14.2 ft)
- Stages: 2

Capacity

Payload to LEO
- Mass: 16,300 kg (35,900 lb)

Payload to GTO
- Mass: 3,200 kg (7,100 lb)

Payload to TLI
- Mass: 2,300 kg (5,100 lb)

Launch history
- Status: Planned
- Launch sites: Cape Canaveral, SLC-20; Vandenberg, SLC-2W; MARS, LP-0A
- Total launches: 0
- First flight: 2029 (expected)

First stage
- Powered by: 7 × Miranda
- Maximum thrust: 7,161 kN (1,610,000 lb_{f})
- Specific impulse: 305 s (2.99 km/s)
- Propellant: RP-1 / LOX

Second stage
- Powered by: 1 × Vira
- Maximum thrust: 890 kN (200,000 lb_{f})
- Specific impulse: 328 s (3.22 km/s)
- Propellant: RP-1 / LOX

Eclipse, previously known as Firefly Beta and the Medium Launch Vehicle (MLV), is a two-stage, partially reusable medium-lift launch vehicle being jointly developed by Firefly Aerospace and Northrop Grumman. Formally announced in 2022, the rocket is designed to be a successor to Northrop Grumman's Antares launch vehicle, able to be partially reused and can launch 16,300 kg (35,900 lb) into low Earth orbit. Currently, the maiden launch of Eclipse is expected in 2029.

== History ==
=== Firefly Beta ===
Eclipse can be traced back to the late 2010s, following Firefly Space Systems' 2017 liquidation and reestablishment as Firefly Aerospace. It was originally conceptualized as Firefly Beta, following a naming scheme previously established by the Firefly Alpha small-lift launcher. Beta's initial design consisted of three Alpha cores strapped together in a fashion similar to Delta IV Heavy or Falcon Heavy. This triple core configuration would not last, as by 2020 Firefly announced a redesign that replaced it with a scaled up iteration of Alpha, having a 3.7 m (12 ft) stage diameter, a 4.7 m (15 ft) tall fairing, and utilizing five Reaver 2 engines for its first stage. Additionally, Beta would be capable of placing 8,000 kg (17,600 lb) into LEO and 5,800 kg (12,800 lb) into Sun-synchronous orbit. In October 2021, it was planned that Beta would have its maiden launch in the second half of 2024.

In October 2019, Firefly and Aerojet Rocketdyne announced they would form a partnership, detailing that Firefly would manufacture a lifter making use of the AR1 engine. However, it is unknown if this partnership ever lasted beyond concepts and proposals.

=== Collaboration with Northrop Grumman ===
On August 8, 2022, Firefly and Northrop Grumman announced a partnership where they would collaborate on the development of both Beta and Antares. Originally operated by Orbital Science Corporation (later Orbital ATK) before their 2018 acquisition by Northrop Grumman, Antares's first stage was Ukrainian manufactured and powered by two Russian made RD-181 engines. This setup was jeopardized following the Russian invasion of Ukraine back in February, and forced Northrop Grumman to look in other directions regarding the future of Antares.

As part of the announcement, Beta was officially rechristened as the Medium Launch Vehicle (MLV), receiving another redesign and stating that a de-rated version of MLV's first stage would be used for the newly unveiled Antares 300-series. Additionally, MLV would be designed as a full-on successor to Antares, with the 300-series being flown for three Cygnus flights as a stopgap while MLV continues development. As such, the rocket would also be able to launch from Antares's launch site at Wallops Island in Virginia.

=== Renaming to Eclipse ===
In February 2024, Firefly announced that they would be expanding the size of their manufacturing facility in Briggs, Texas to support the production of MLV and Antares 330. This expansion doubles the area of the complex from 8,550 m^{2} (92,000 square feet) to 19,230 m^{2} (207,000 square feet). Two months later, they reported that the development was progressing smoothly, with the rockets' Miranda engines beginning full production in June.

In the summer of 2024, Firefly and Northrop Grumman made an announcement that MLV would pursue a partially reusable configuration in a similar vein to the operations of Falcon 9, New Glenn, and Neutron. They clarified that the first stage will be able to perform return to launch site (RTLS) maneuvers and landings, hoping that the technology for doing so would be refined and put into full use by the sixth flight of the vehicle after its first several flights are made in an expendable configuration.

On May 29, 2025, Firefly announced that they have received a US$50 million investment by Northrop Grumman in their joint development of the rocket. Additionally, the two companies officially renamed the Medium Launch Vehicle to Eclipse.

== Design ==
Both stages of Eclipse will use RP-1 and LOX propellant and a carbon-fiber composite for its air-frame, iterating on a process similarly used in the construction and flight of Alpha. Together, the vehicle stands at 55.7 m (183 ft) in height and 4.32 m (14.2 ft) in diameter. Additionally, the fairings are 5.4 m (17.7 ft) in diameter and can be customized to suit a variety of payload sizes.

The first stage will be powered by seven Miranda tap-off engines, being able to provide 7,161 kN (1,610,000 lb_{f}) of thrust and has 305 seconds of specific impulse (I_{sp}). This stage is designed to be reusable, though a de-rated and expendable version will be used as the first stage of the Antares 330. The second stage will be powered with a singular Vira vacuum engine, providing 800 kN (180,000 lb_{f}) of thrust with an impulse of 328 seconds. This stage will be expended, and thus any Eclipse flight will have a new unit flown for each launch.

== Operations ==
The maiden flight and other early launches of Eclipse will be made at Launch Pad 0A (LP-0A) from the Mid-Atlantic Regional Spaceport (MARS) at the Wallops Flight Facility in Virginia. LP-0A was originally built for use in the 1990s for the Conestoga launch vehicle, and has subsequently been used from 2013 to 2023 by the Antares 100 and 200 series. This is in part because of the ease in comparability with Antares 330 thanks to the similarity in first stage engine. Eclipse will additionally share the pad with Alpha for launches from Wallops, being able to interchange the architecture to support both vehicles.

Eclipse will also be able to make polar orbital launches from Space Launch Complex 2 West (SLC-2W) at Vandenberg Space Force Base in California. Historically a Thor and Delta pad for the Western Range, it originally made its way into Firefly's hands following the Delta II's retirement in 2018 and is currently being used to launch Alpha. Similarly to LP-0A, SLC-2W will also be configurable to launch both Alpha and Eclipse.

Firefly and Northrop Grumman additionally plan to supplement LP-0A's prograde launches with the use of Space Launch Complex 20 (SLC-20) at Cape Canaveral Space Force Station in Florida. SLC-20 is located at the very north of Missile Row, previously used by the Titan I and Titan IIIA in the 1960s as well as various sounding rockets in the 1990s. Firefly first gained control of the pad in 2019, following the United States Air Force making an expansion of Eastern Range launch activities in the wake of the NewSpace boom. Firefly has declared intentions to construct an assembly facility at Cape Canaveral; however, they have acknowledged in 2024 that they are prioritizing development at LP-0A first, though they reinforced their commitment to the SLC-20 lease in the same statement.
