= Mid-Atlantic Regional Spaceport =

Commercial space launch facility

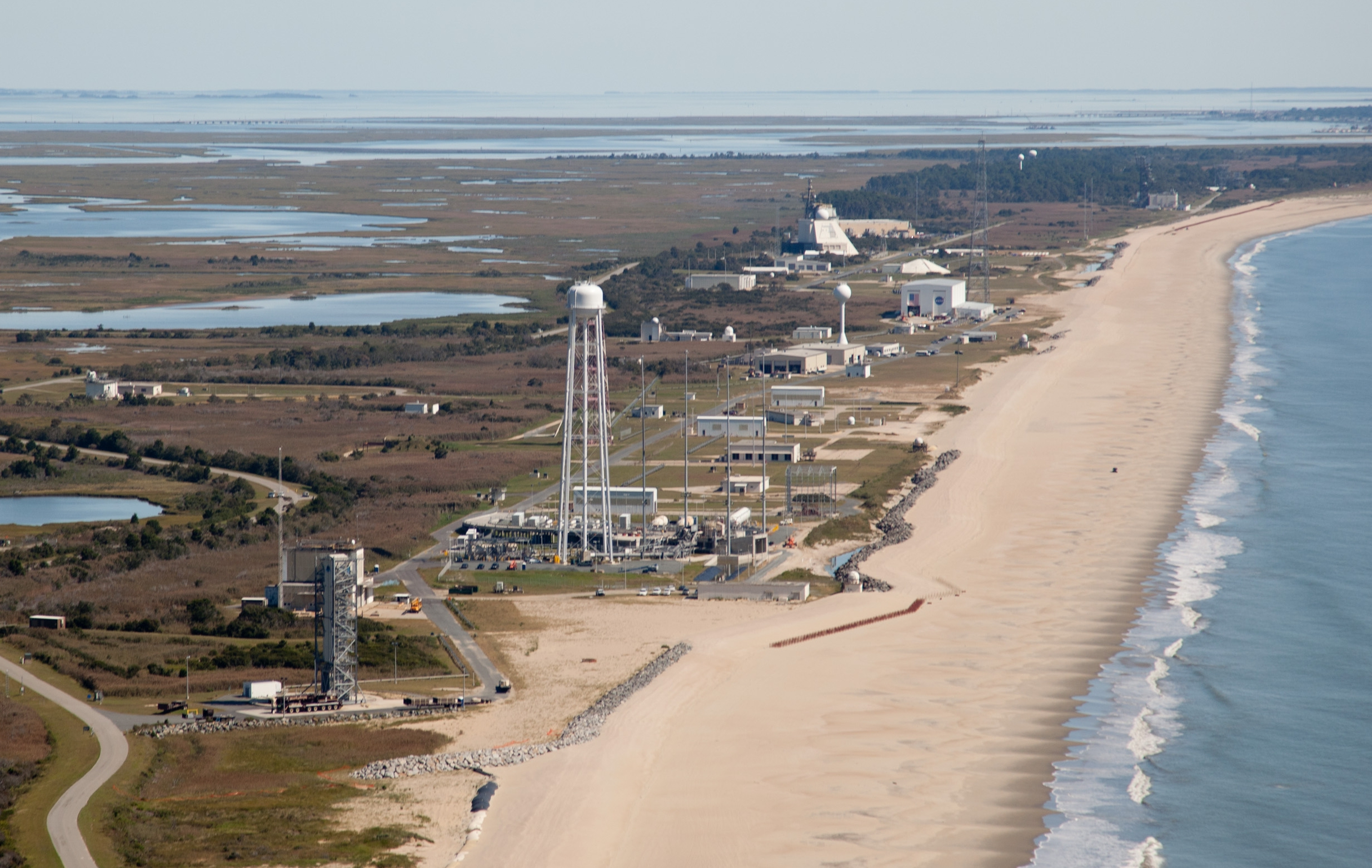
- The Mid-Atlantic Regional Spaceport and, in the background, NASA's Wallops Flight Facility as seen in September 2012.
- Interactive map of Mid-Atlantic Regional Spaceport
- Location: Wallops Island, Accomack County, Virginia
- Time zone: UTC−05:00 (EST)
  - Summer (DST): UTC−04:00 (EDT)
- Short name: MARS
- Established: 1997; 29 years ago
- Operator: Owner: Virginia Spaceport Authority; Tenants: Firefly Aerospace (LP-0A); Northrop Grumman (LP-0A, LP-0B); Rocket Lab (LC-2, LC-3)
- Total launches: 41 (1 Conestoga, 6 Minotaur I, 1 ALV, 18 Antares, 1 Minotaur V, 1 Minotaur IV, 13 Electron)
- Launch pad: 4
LP-0A launch history
- Status: Undergoing renovation
- Launches: 19
- First launch: 23 October 1995; Conestoga-1620 (Meteor)
- Last launch: 2 August 2023; Antares 230+ (Cygnus NG-19)
- Associated rockets: Future: Antares 330, Firefly Alpha, Eclipse; Retired: Conestoga, Antares 100-series, Antares 200-series
LP-0B launch history
- Status: Active
- Launches: 9
- First launch: 16 December 2006; Minotaur I (TacSat 2 and GeneSat)
- Last launch: 15 June 2021; Minotaur I (NROL-111)
- Associated rockets: Current: Minotaur I, Minotaur IV, Minotaur V Retired: ALV; Plans cancelled: Vector-R
LC-2 (LP-0C) launch history
- Status: Active
- Launches: 13
- First launch: 24 January 2023; Electron ("Virginia Is For Launch Lovers")
- Last launch: 11 June 2026; HASTE ("Curveball")
- Associated rockets: Current: Electron
LC-3 (LP-0D) launch history
- Status: Awaiting rocket activation
- Launches: 0
- First launch: 2026 (planned)
- Associated rockets: Future: Neutron

The Mid-Atlantic Regional Spaceport (MARS) is a commercial space launch facility located at the southern tip of NASA's Wallops Flight Facility on Wallops Island in Virginia, just east of the Delmarva Peninsula and south of Chincoteague, Virginia, United States. It is owned and operated by the Virginia Spaceport Authority. MARS is located right next to the NASA Wallops Flight Facility (WFF), which had run the launch complex until 2003. WFF still provides support services to MARS launches under a contract with the Commonwealth of Virginia.

== Background ==
The Virginia General Assembly created the political subdivision Virginia Commercial Space Flight Authority (VCSFA), also known as Virginia Space, in 1995 to promote the development of the commercial space flight industry, economic development, aerospace research, and science, technology, engineering, and math (STEM) education throughout the Commonwealth. This initiative was done from the recommendations of the Batten College at Old Dominion University, with Dr. Billie Reed, a longtime professor at the University, installed as its Executive Director.

In 1997, Virginia Space entered into a Reimbursable Space Act Agreement with NASA, which provided for permitted use of land on NASA Wallops Island for the MARS launch pads. Virginia Space also applied for and was granted an FAA license to launch to orbit. This led to the establishment of the Virginia Space Flight Center, located on the southern portion of NASA Wallops Island. At the time, the Center served as a collective partnership that included the National Aeronautic and Space Administration (NASA), Old Dominion University, and Virginia Space.

The facility received its current name when Governor Robert Ehrlich of Maryland and Governor Mark Warner of Virginia signed an joint agreement that directed the Virginia Secretary of Commerce and Maryland's Secretary of Business and Economic Development (now Secretary of Commerce) to create a committee which would develop a concept and implementation plan for joint administration of the center. As such, the Virginia Space Flight Center was renamed as the Mid-Atlantic Regional Spaceport (MARS), reflecting the location of the facilities as opposed to the singular state.

MARS is approved for launch azimuths from 38° to 60°, making it an ideal location from which to launch to the International Space Station (ISS).

In 2007, NASA selected Virginia-based Orbital Sciences Corporation (now Northrop Grumman) to participate in the Commercial Orbital Transportation Services (COTS) program and then selected Orbital for a follow-on Commercial Resupply Service (CRS) contract to build and demonstrate a new rocket, Antares, to resupply the International Space Station (ISS). The CRS contract authorized eight missions from 2012 to 2015 to carry approximately 20,000 kg of cargo to the ISS as well as to dispose of waste. These launches were to take place from the then-newly refurbished and upgraded MARS Pad 0A.

On MARS Pad 0B, VCSFA made modifications and upgrades to launch the NASA Lunar Atmosphere and Dust Environment Explorer (LADEE) mission to the Moon in mid-2013 on a new Orbital Sciences Minotaur V launch vehicle. Also in mid-2013, the USAF launched ORS-3 from MARS Pad 0B.

MARS is one of only several sites licensed by the FAA Office of Commercial Space Transportation to launch to orbit. Additionally, Virginia is home to the National Reconnaissance Office (NRO) and NASA's Langley Research Center (LaRC) and as such is a recipient of a large portion of the federal budget for space. Finally, according to the Information Technology and Innovation Foundation, Virginia ranks first in the number of scientists and engineers as a percentage of the workforce, third in the concentration of high-tech jobs as a percentage of the workforce, and sixth in non-industry investment in research and development.

== Facilities ==
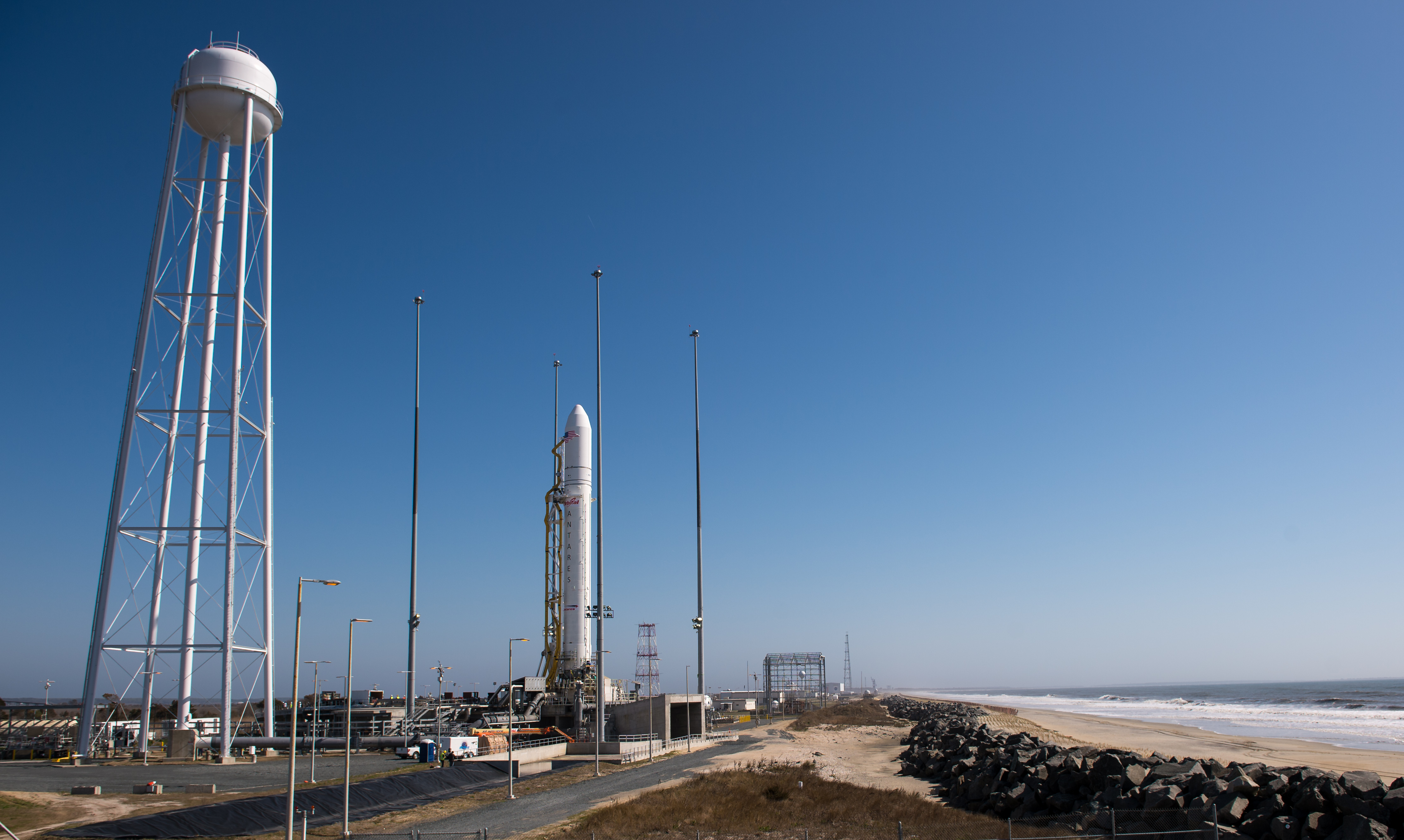
The first Antares rocket on Launch Pad 0A. At left is a water tower to supply water for sound suppression.

Launch Pad 0 (LP-0), also known as Launch Complex 0 (LC-0), or Launch Area 0 (LA-0), is the launch complex at the MARS. The launch complex consists of four individual launch pads, LP-0A, LP-0B, LP-0C, and LP-0D, the latter two referred to by tenant Rocket Lab as Launch Complex 2 (LC-2) and 3 (LC-3).

=== Launch Pad 0A (LP-0A) ===
Pad 0A (located at 37.833959°N 75.4878331°W) was built in the 1990s for the Conestoga rocket, which made its only flight in 1995. The launch tower was subsequently demolished in September 2008, and the pad has since been rebuilt for use by the Northrop Grumman Antares. The pad modifications for Antares included the construction of a Horizontal Integration Facility (HIF) for launcher/payload mating and a wheeled transporter/erector that will "roll out and erect the rocket on its launch pad about 24 hours prior to launch".

The facility suffered significant damage during the 28 October 2014 Antares launch failure, according to NASA officials in the immediate aftermath. It crashed 6 seconds after takeoff and appeared to have done significant damage to the launch pad itself. On October 29, 2014, teams of investigators began examining debris at the crash site. Preliminary estimates for rebuilding the pad indicated the cost should be no more than US$20 million. By May 2015, that estimate had been revised down to US$13 million and repairs were expected to be completed by September or October 2015 with the next planned launch in March 2016. At that time, NASA had committed US$5 million, Virginia Commercial Space Flight Authority committed US$3 million and Orbital ATK US$3 million. On September 30, 2015, the spaceport announced repairs on pad 0A had been completed. The pad was reinforced with pilings and features a liquid fueling facility, flame trench, and deluge system for cooling and sound suppression. The pad is capable of supporting a gross liftoff weight of 453.6 metric tons (1,000,000 lb) and can launch payloads of up to 5,035 kilograms (11,100 lb) into low Earth orbit.

The launch pad resumed flight operations with the Cygnus CRS OA-5 mission on October 17, 2016.

In March 2021, Rocket Lab announced that they would launch their upcoming medium-lift launch vehicle Neutron from LP-0A, with the initial launch planned for as early as 2024. However, Rocket Lab later opted to construct their own Neutron launch site between Pad 0B and Pad 0C.

In August 2022, Northrop Grumman announced that they plan to transition from the 200-series to the 300-series of Antares, as the Russian invasion of Ukraine in February ended the production of the Russian-designed and Ukrainian-built RD-181 used as the first stage engine. As a result, LP-0A and surrounding facilities would require moderate renovations in order to support the upgraded rocket's larger first stage to be produced by Firefly Aerospace. As part of the renovation, Firefly also announced that the facility will become an East Coast launch site of their own Firefly Alpha lifter upon the pad's completion, helping support existing operations from SLC-2W at Vandenberg Space Force Base and future operations at SLC-20 at Cape Canaveral. In addition, Firefly and Northrop Grumman plans for LP-0A to support the launching and landing of their Antares successor currently in development, Eclipse.

Following the Cygnus NG-19 launch in August 2023, Pad 0A was taken offline for the pad and facilities to be upgraded to support the new Antares 330 rocket, which will have approximately twice the thrust as its predecessor, Antares 230+. The pad and transporter erector must accept the wider diameter of the new first stage, and the HIF must be lengthened. In addition, the complex is being upgraded to support the future Northrop Grumman Eclipse alongside Firefly Aerospace, based on the Antares 330 but sporting a liquid-fueled second stage.

For sound suppression and cooling the pad during launches, there is a 307 ft (94 m)-tall water tower.

==== Gallery ====
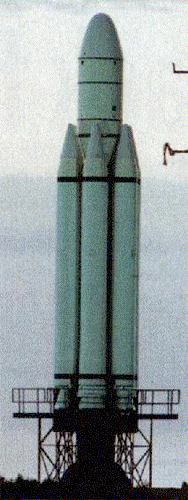
Conestoga-1620 on pad, 1995

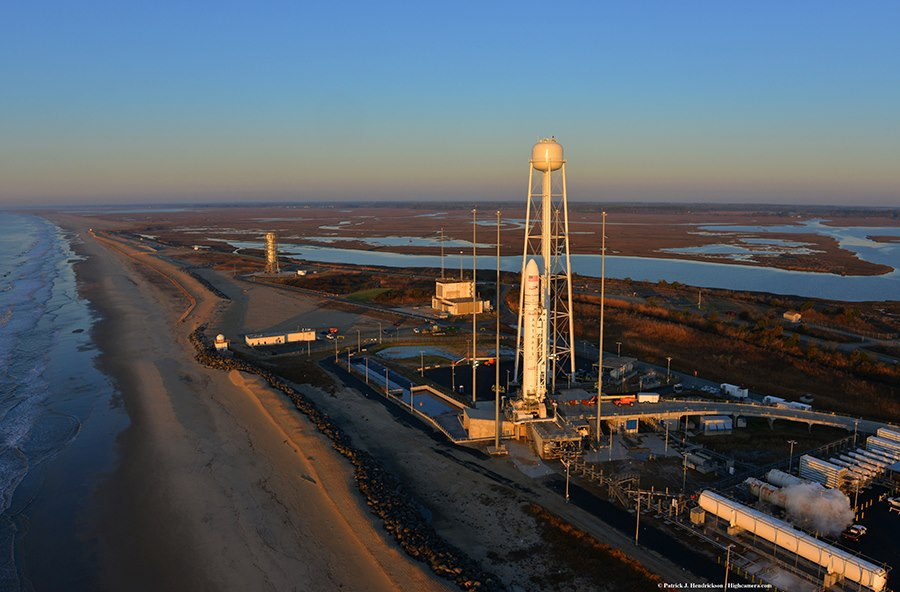
Antares 110 on pad (Antares A-One), 2013

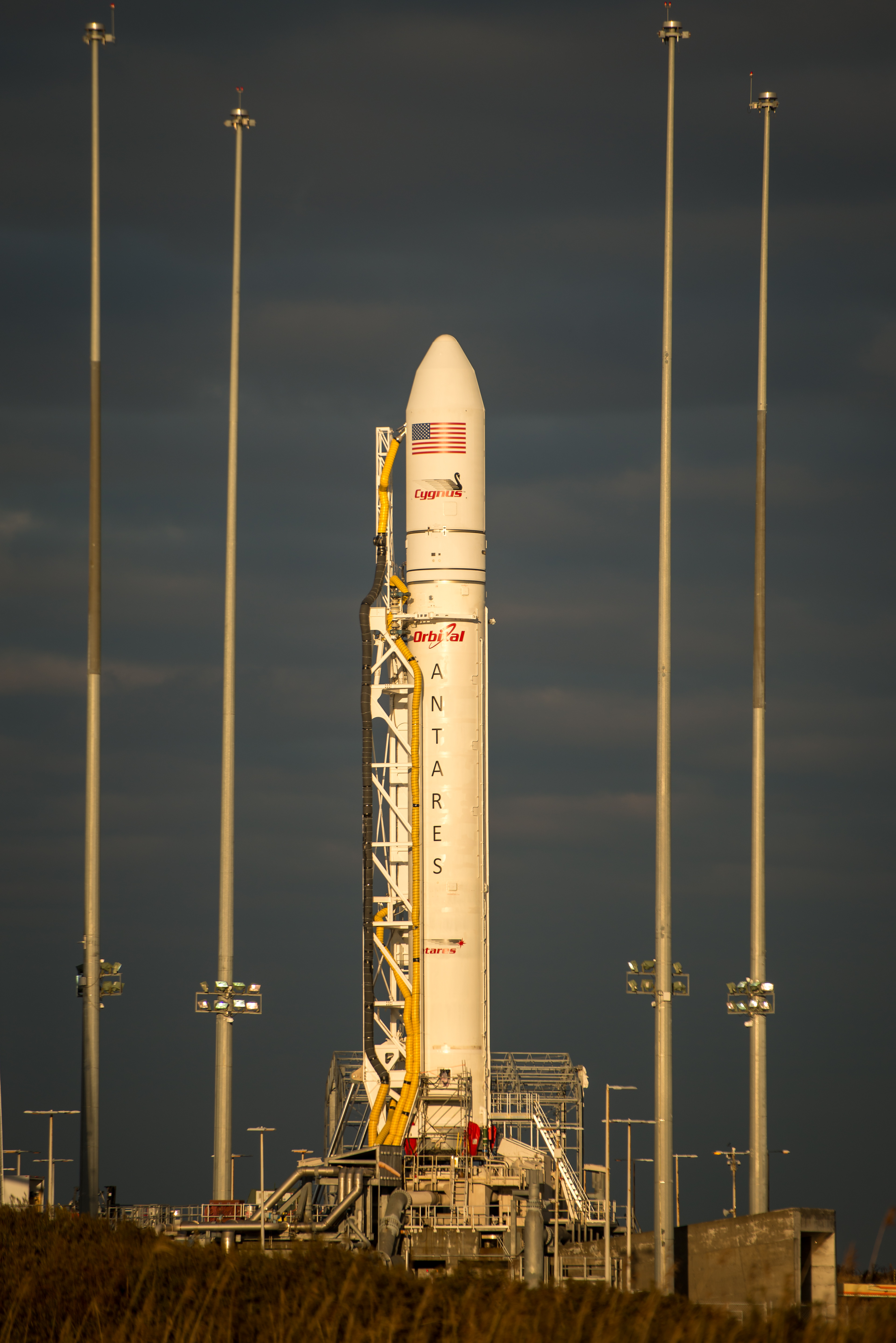
Antares 120 on pad (CRS Orb-1), 2014

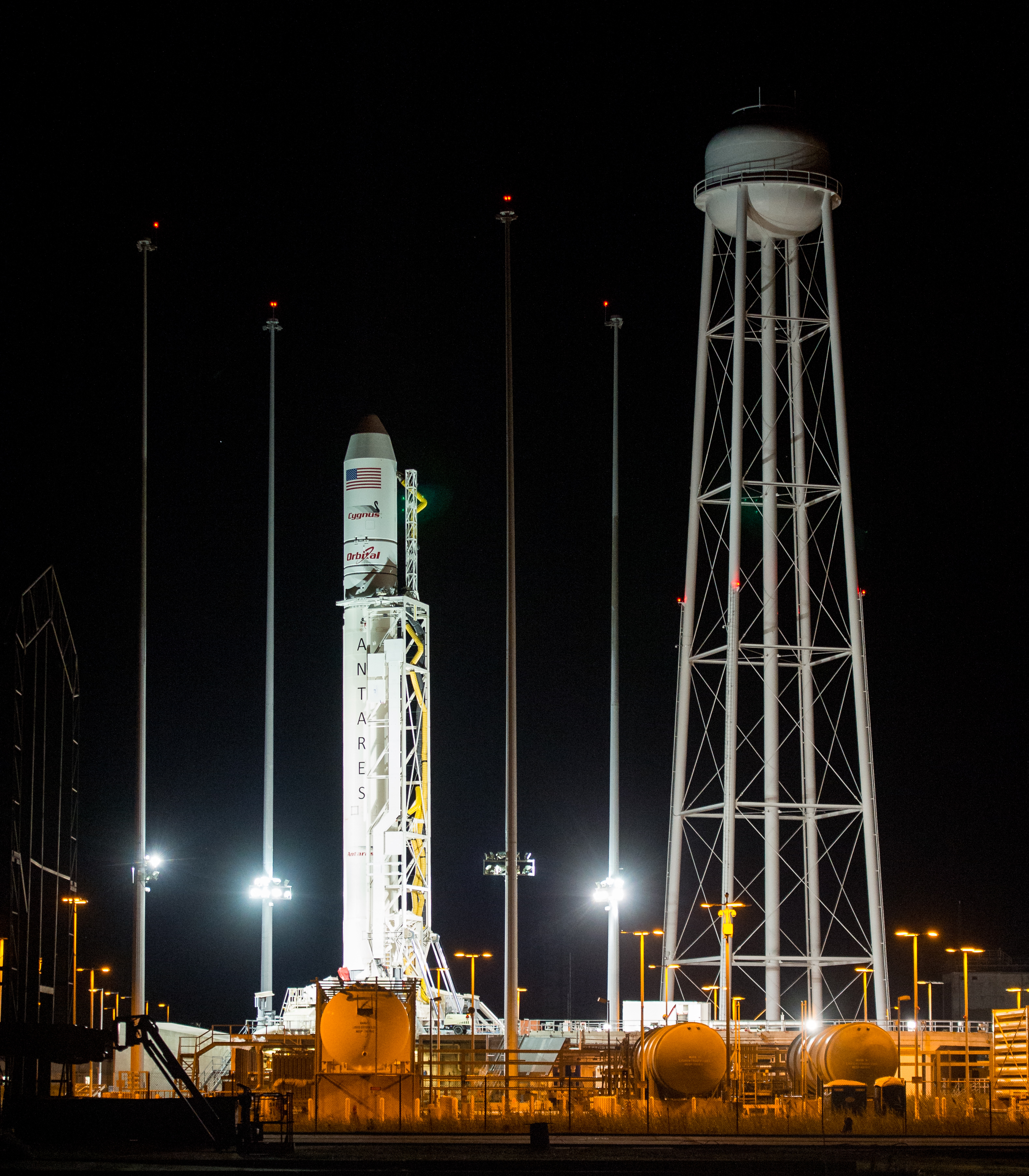
Antares 130 on pad (CRS Orb-3), 2014

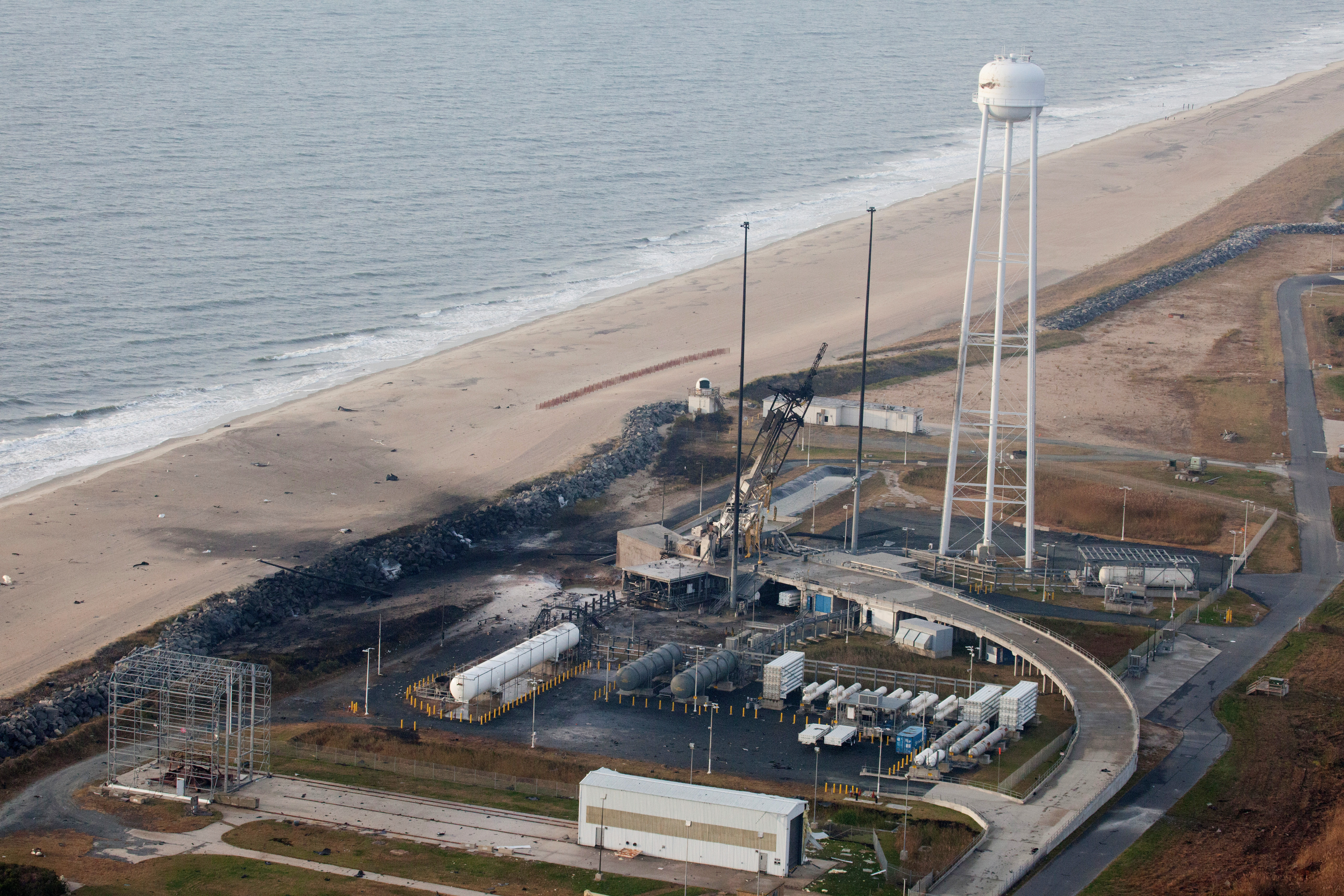
The Pad 0A facilities the day after the October 28, 2014 launch failure.

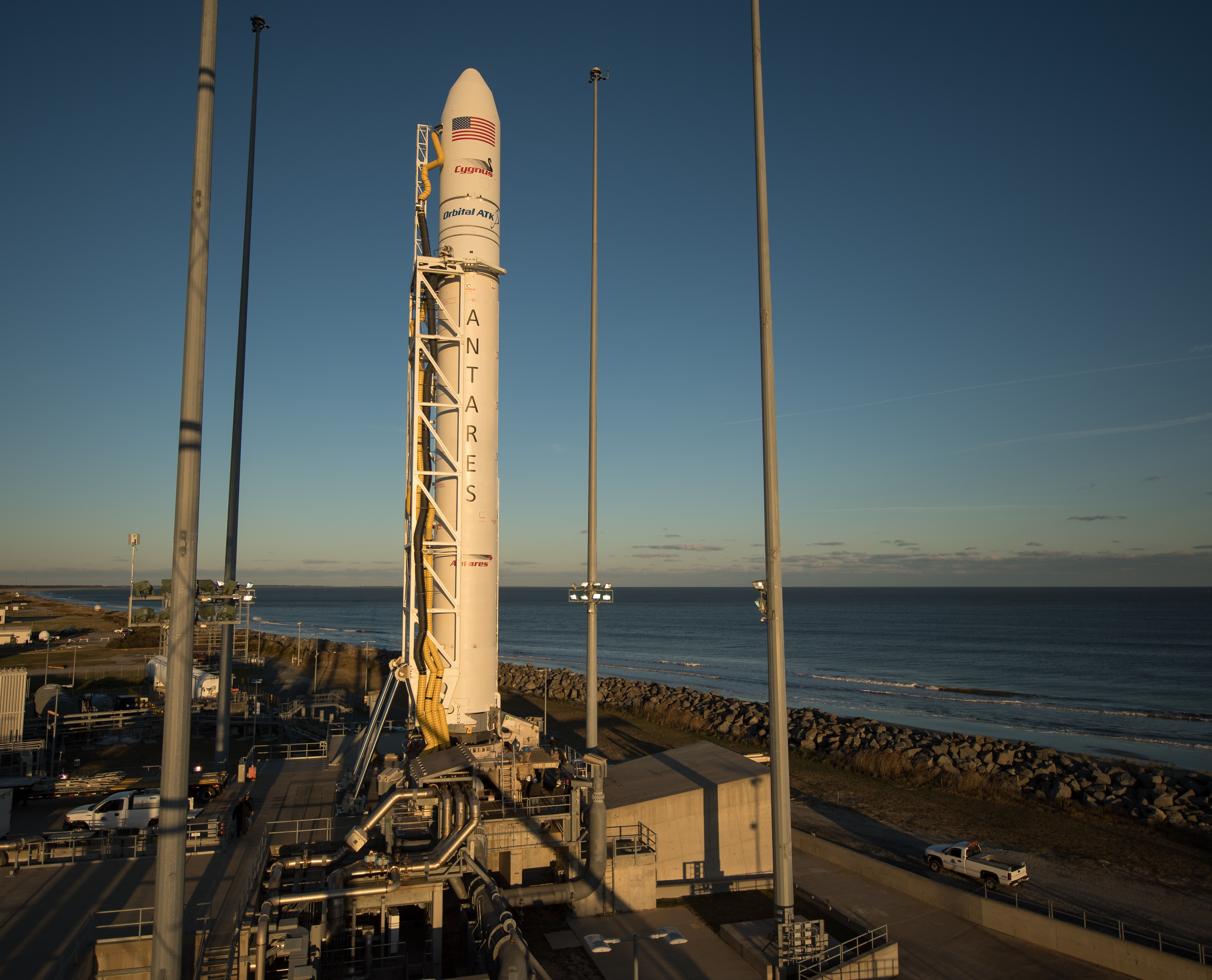
Antares 230 on pad (CRS OA-8E), 2017

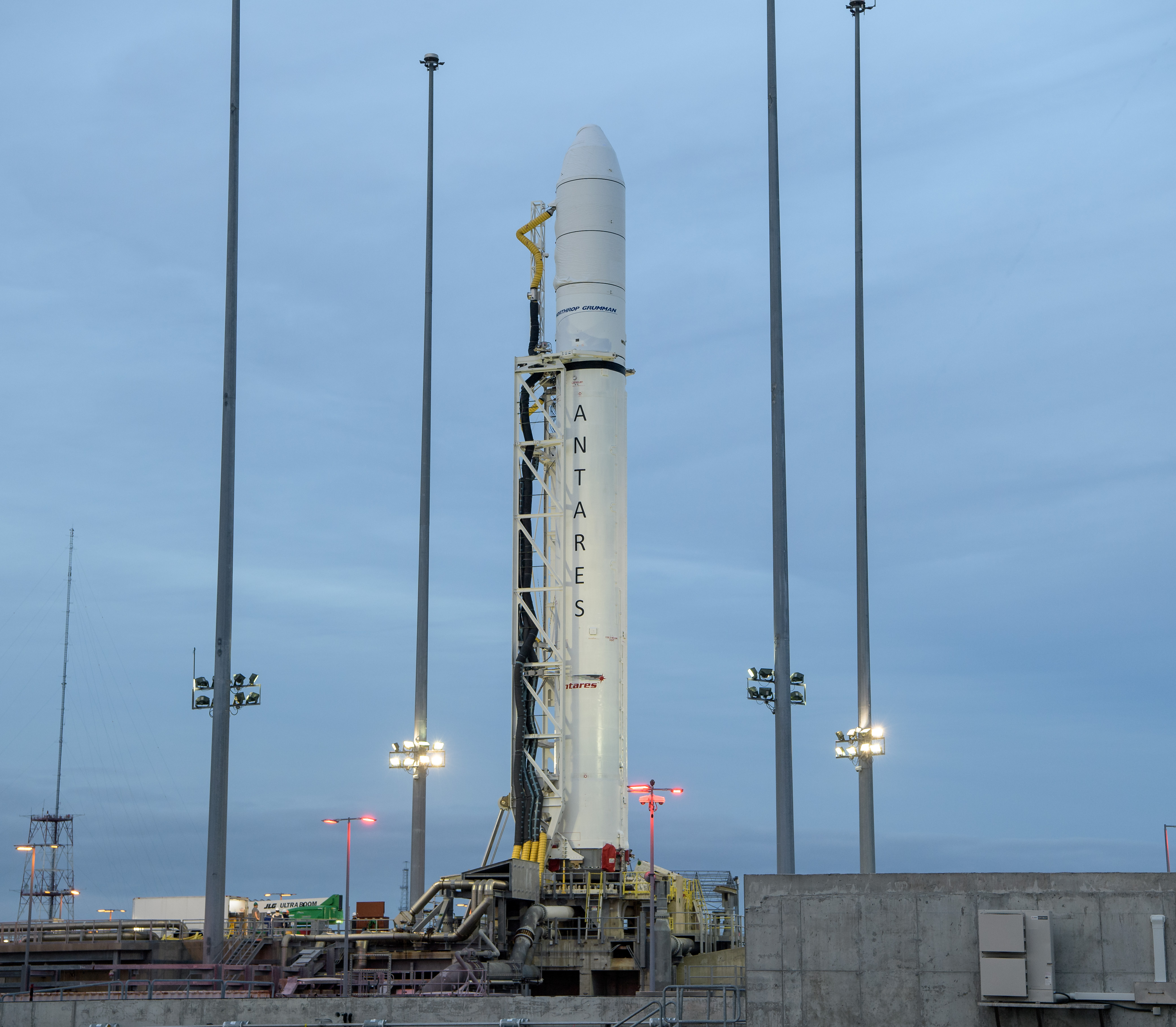
Antares 230+ on pad (Cygnus NG-12), 2019

=== Launch Pad 0B (LP-0B) ===
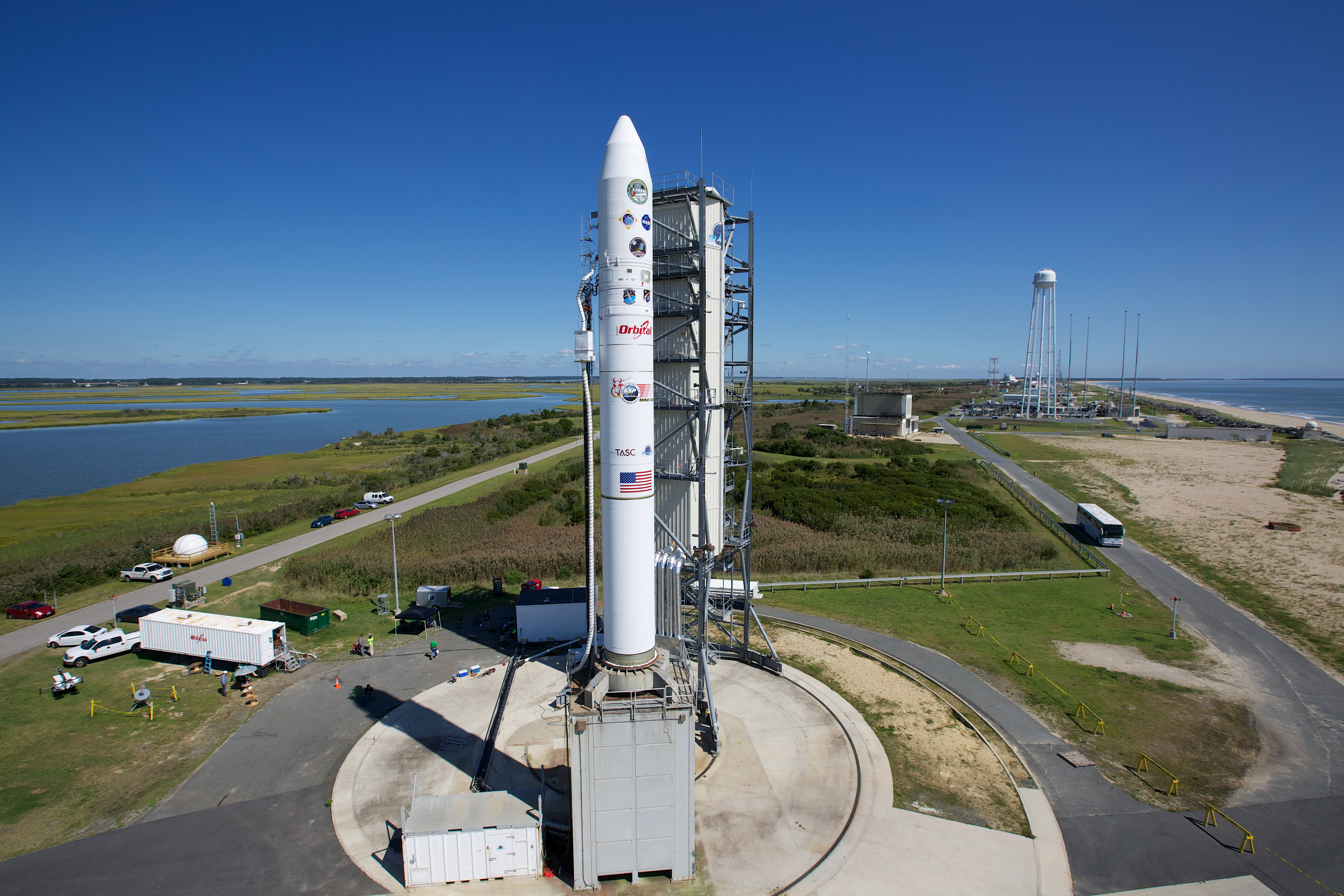
A Minotaur V rocket at Launch Pad 0B in September 2013 ahead of the launch of LADEE.

LP-0B (located at 37.8311576°N 75.4913829°W) became operational in 1999, and was subsequently upgraded in 2003 with the construction of a mobile service tower, which was completed in 2004. It is active, and is currently used by Northrop Grumman Minotaur rockets. The first launch from LP-0B was of a Minotaur I in December 2006, and was the first launch from the Mid-Atlantic Regional Spaceport.

Pad 0B hosted the Minotaur V launch of the LADEE lunar orbiter in 2013, becoming the first (and so far only) beyond-Earth mission to launch from Wallops.

On October 19, 2017, Vector Launch announced plans to conduct three launches from near Pad 0B with its then-in-development Vector-R small satellite launch vehicle over the subsequent two years, with an option for five additional launches. However, following the company's bankruptcy and restructuring, plans for these launches are unlikely.

It remains active, and is currently used by Northrop Grumman Minotaur rockets. However, the Minotaur launch rate has decreased in recent years, leaving multi-year gaps between launches from Pad 0B.

==== Gallery ====
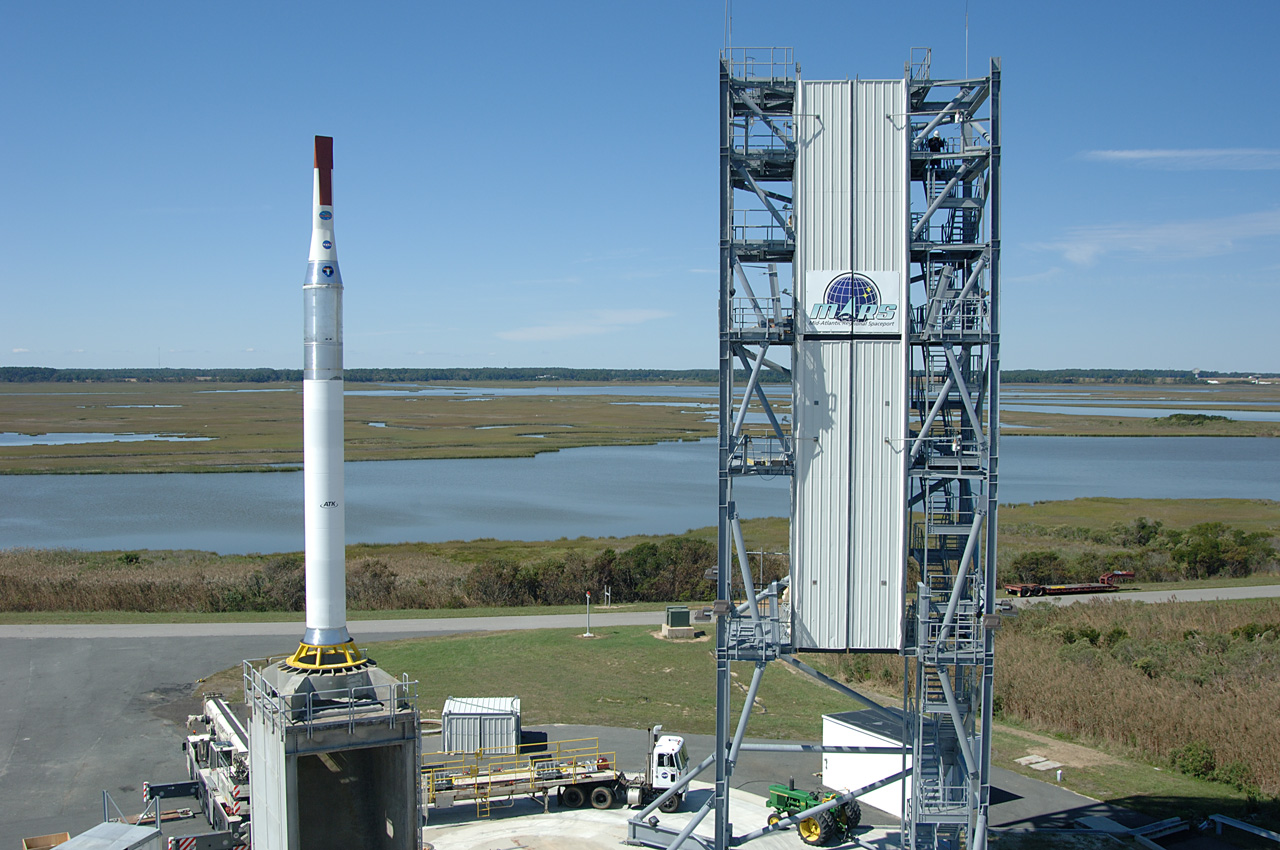
ALV X-1, 2008

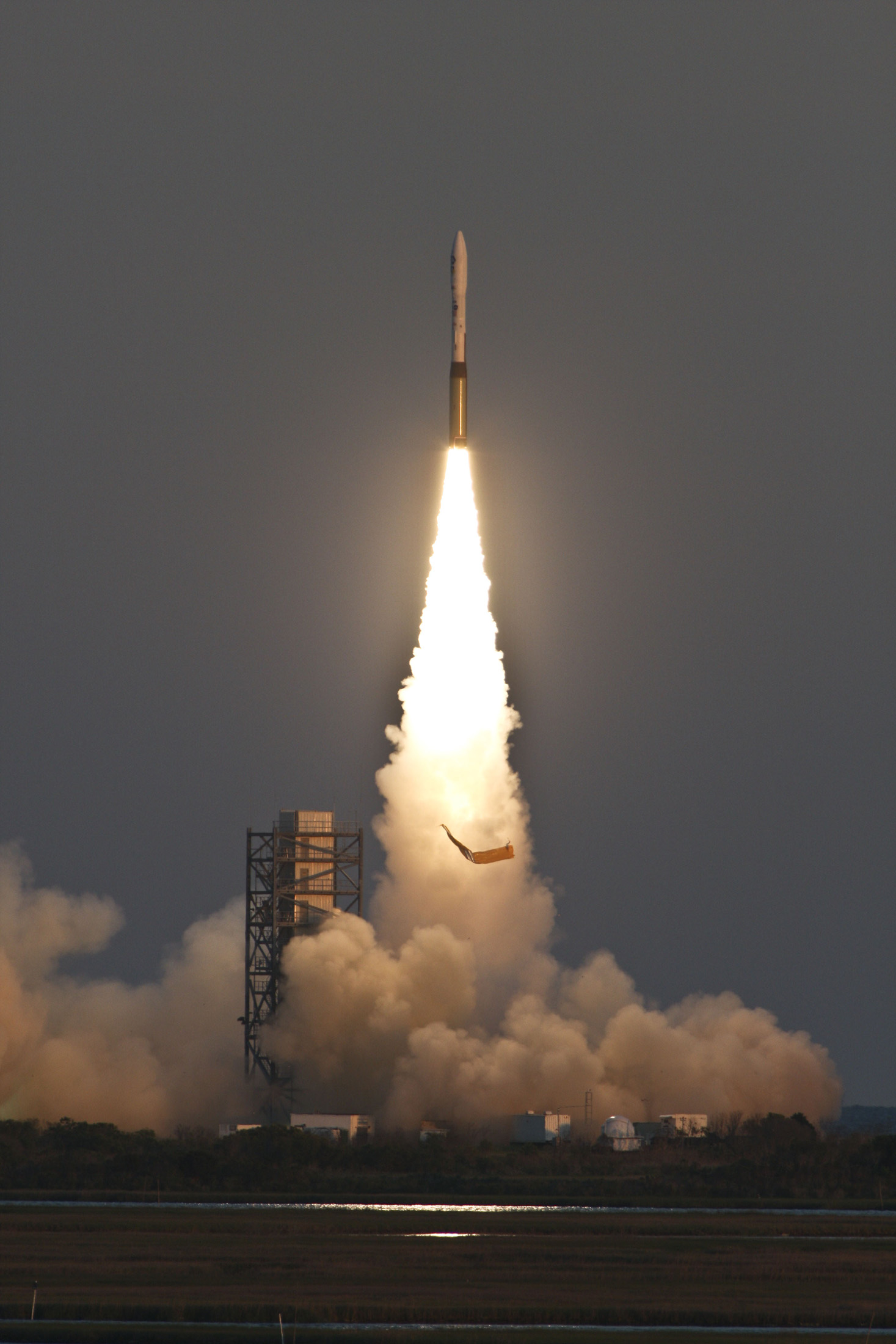
Minotaur I launch (TacSat-3), 2009

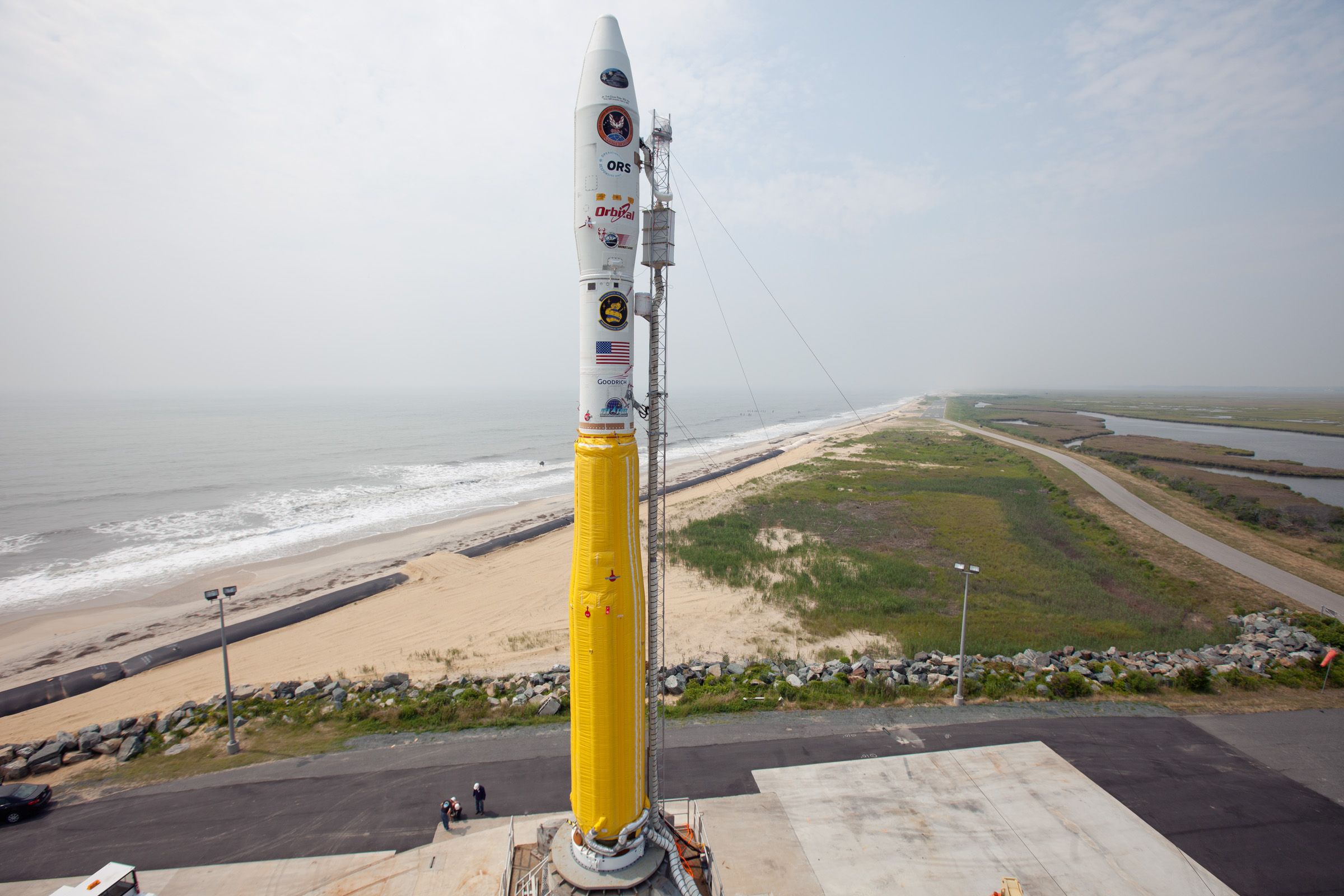
Minotaur I on pad (ORS-1), 2011

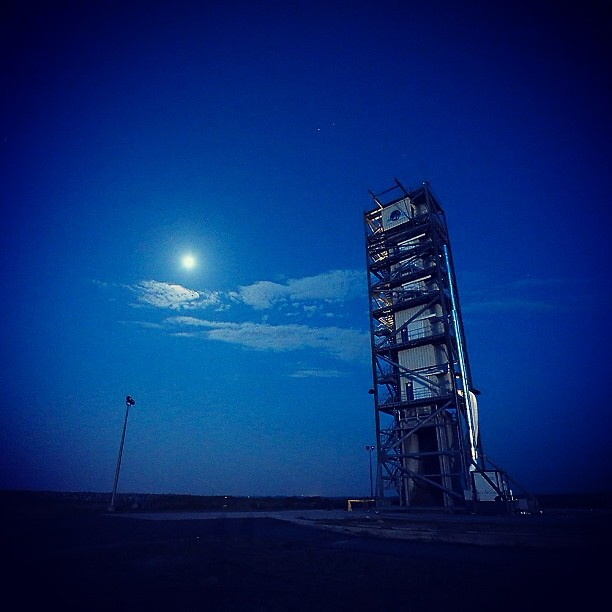
Gantry at Pad 0B on Sept. 4, 2013.

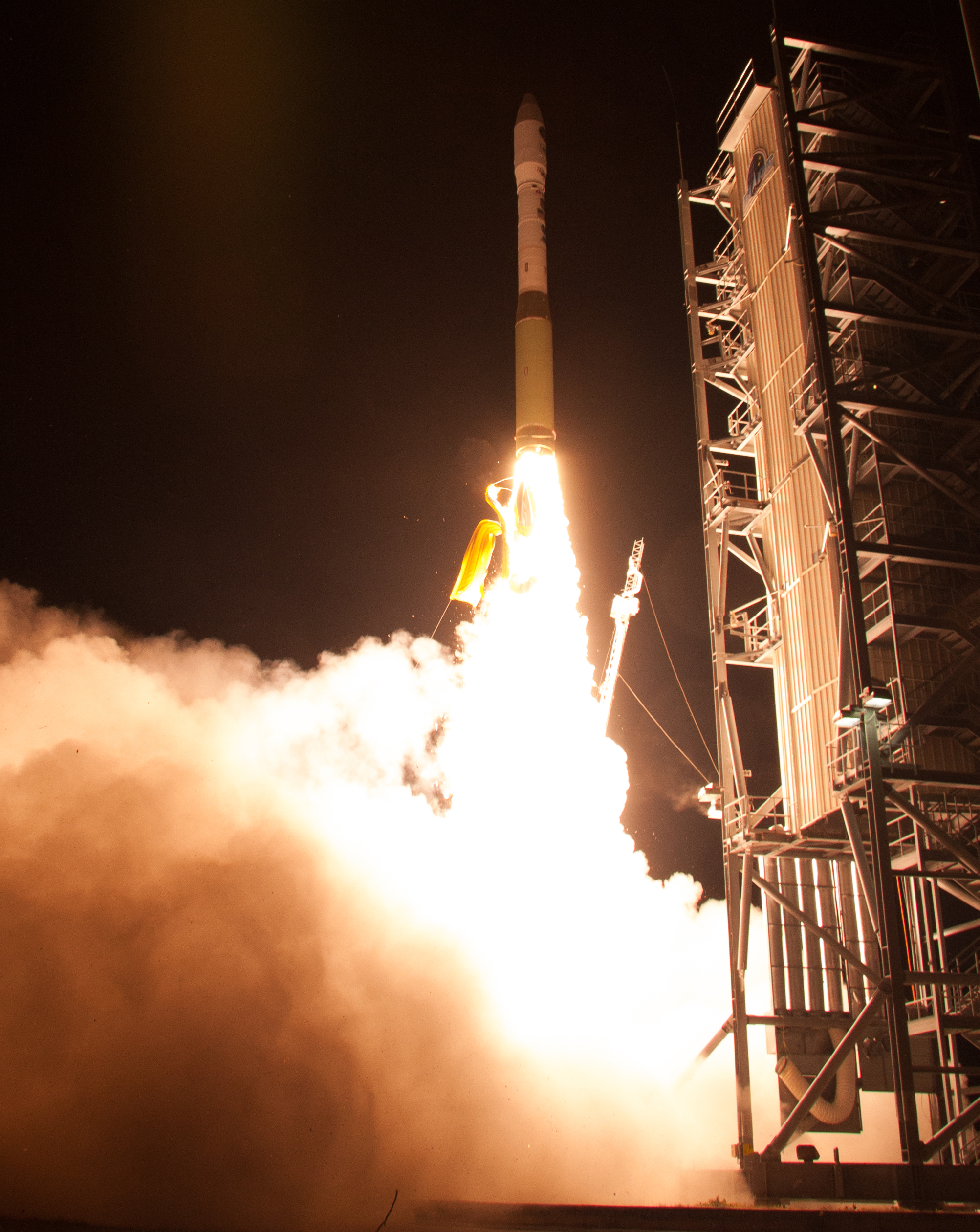
Minotaur I launch (STPSat 3), 2013

=== Launch Pad 0C (LP-0C)/Launch Complex-2 (LC-2) ===
In October 2018, Rocket Lab announced that it had selected MARS as its second launch site, called Rocket Lab Launch Complex-2 (located at 37.833266°N 75.4882304°W). The company began construction in February 2019, together with the Virginia Commercial Space Flight Authority (Virginia Space). In December 2019, Rocket Lab said it had built and completed Launch Complex-2 (LC-2), a new launch pad near Pad 0A, and was ready to support missions just 10 months later with the first launch scheduled for the third quarter of 2020. At a press conference on the same day at the NASA Wallops Flight Facility, the Space Test Program of the United States Air Force (now United States Space Force) was announced as the planned first customer for the Electron launch vehicle from LC-2. The mission was planned to launch a single research and development micro-satellite. This plan did not occur. In April 2020, Rocket Lab performed a Wet Dress Rehearsal with an Electron rocket on the pad.

The new launch pad is near Pad 0A (and shares some systems with Pad 0A). Rockets launched from LC-2 are integrated at Rocket Lab's integration facility, located just a few miles away from the pad. They are transported to the pad and integrated onto the strongback.

The first launch from LC-2 successfully occurred on January 24, 2023. An Electron rocket carried three satellites to orbit in a mission named "Virginia is for Launch Lovers", the launch title referencing Virginia's well-known tourism slogan "Virginia is for Lovers". Since then, LC-2 has seen several orbital Electron launches, including a handful of suborbital missions by the HASTE configuration of Electron.

=== Launch Pad 0D (LP-0D)/Launch Complex-3 (LC-3) ===
In October 2023, construction of a new launch site between LP-0A and LP-0B was seen. The new launch site will be for Rocket Lab's Neutron and will be named Launch pad 0D (LP-0D). Rocket Lab will refer to LP-0D as Launch Complex 3 or LC-3.

The pad was officially declared ready for use on September 2, 2025, with a ribbon-cutting ceremony being held and attended by Virginia Governor Glenn Youngkin, Rocket Lab CEO Peter Beck, and other notable staff.

== Launch pad chart ==
Launch Sites at the Mid-Atlantic Regional Spaceport
Active pads
Inactive leased pads
Inactive unleased pads
1 LP-0A
2 LP-0B
3 LP-0C (LC-2)
4 LP-0D (LC-3)

Complex	Status	Tenant	Uses	Notable Launches	Coordinates
Launch Pad 0A	Undergoing renovation	Northrop Grumman and Firefly Aerospace	Future: Antares 330, Alpha, Eclipse; Retired: Conestoga, Antares 100-series, Antares 200-series	Cygnus Orb-D1, Cygnus Orb-3, Cygnus OA-5, Cygnus NG-10	37.833959°N 75.4878331°W
Launch Pad 0B	Active	Northrop Grumman	Current: Minotaur I, Minotaur IV, Minotaur V Retired: ALV X-1; Cancelled: Vector-R	LADEE	37.8311576°N 75.4913829°W
Launch Pad 0C (Launch Complex 2)	Active	Rocket Lab	Current: Electron		37.833266°N 75.4882304°W
Launch Pad 0D (Launch Complex 3)	Awaiting rocket activation	Rocket Lab	Future: Neutron		37.8321693°N 75.4899046°W

== Launch history ==
=== LP-0A ===
- Conestoga
- Antares 100-series
- Antares 200-series
- Antares 300-series
- Firefly Alpha
- Eclipse

Conestoga launch operated by Space Services. Antares launches operated by Orbital Sciences Corporation in 2013 and 2014, Orbital ATK from 2016 to May 2018, and Northrop Grumman since November 2018.

No.	Date	Time (UTC)	Launch vehicle	Configuration	Payload	Result	Remarks
1	23 October 1995	22:02	Conestoga	Conestoga 1620	METEOR	Failure	First launch from LP-0A, and only orbital launch of Conestoga. First launch from MARS and first non-Scout orbital launch from Wallops. Low frequency noise caused erroneous course changes, leading to self-destruction 46 seconds after launch.
2	21 April 2013	21:00	Antares	Antares 110	Antares A-ONE	Success	Maiden flight of Antares, and first successful launch from LP-0A. First of two demo missions for Commercial Orbital Transportation Services. Carried a boilerplate payload.
3	18 September 2013	14:58	Antares	Antares 110	Cygnus Orb-D1	Success	Second and last of two demo missions for COTS. First launch of an operational Cygnus spacecraft, going to the International Space Station. Made Wallops/MARS the fifth space center to launch a payload to the ISS, after Baikonur, Cape Canaveral/KSC, Kourou, and Tanegashima.
4	9 January 2014	18:07	Antares	Antares 120	Cygnus CRS Orb-1	Success	ISS resupply flight.
5	13 July 2014	16:52	Antares	Antares 120	Cygnus CRS Orb-2	Success	ISS resupply flight.
6	28 October 2014	22:22	Antares	Antares 130	Cygnus CRS Orb-3	Failure	ISS resupply flight. Final flight of Antares 100, and final flight of Cygnus's standard variant. Turbopump failure in first stage engine caused rocket to fall back onto pad, activating range safety protocols 23 seconds after launch. Pad was extensively damaged by flight, leading to three Cygnus flights to be moved to Atlas V.
7	17 October 2016	23:45	Antares	Antares 230	Cygnus CRS OA-5	Success	ISS resupply flight. First launch from LP-0A since Orb-3, and maiden flight of Antares 200. First flight from LP-0A operated by Orbital ATK, and first flight of Cygnus's enhanced variant from MARS.
8	12 November 2017	12:19	Antares	Antares 230	Cygnus CRS OA-8E	Success	ISS resupply flight.
9	21 May 2018	08:44	Antares	Antares 230	Cygnus CRS OA-9E	Success	ISS resupply flight.
10	17 November 2018	09:01	Antares	Antares 230	Cygnus CRS NG-10	Success	ISS resupply flight. First launch from LP-0A and first Cygnus flight operated by Northrop Grumman.
11	17 April 2019	16:46	Antares	Antares 230	Cygnus CRS NG-11	Success	ISS resupply flight.
12	2 November 2019	13:59	Antares	Antares 230+	Cygnus CRS NG-12	Success	ISS resupply flight. Contained the National Reconnaissance Office's IMPACT-2A and 2B demonstration satellites as a secondary payload.
13	15 February 2020	20:21	Antares	Antares 230+	Cygnus CRS NG-13	Success	ISS resupply flight.
14	3 October 2020	02:16	Antares	Antares 230+	Cygnus CRS NG-14	Success	ISS resupply flight.
15	20 February 2021	17:36	Antares	Antares 230+	Cygnus CRS NG-15	Success	ISS resupply flight.
16	10 August 2021	22:01	Antares	Antares 230+	Cygnus CRS NG-16	Success	ISS resupply flight.
17	19 February 2022	17:40	Antares	Antares 230+	Cygnus CRS NG-17	Success	ISS resupply flight.
18	7 November 2022	10:32	Antares	Antares 230+	Cygnus CRS NG-18	Success	ISS resupply flight.
19	2 August 2023	00:31	Antares	Antares 230+	Cygnus CRS NG-19	Success	ISS resupply flight. Final flight of Antares 200, being forced to retire due to first stage production being jeopardized by the Russian invasion of Ukraine. Led to four additional Cygnus flights (with one being replaced following damage during shipping) being moved to Falcon 9.

=== LP-0B ===
- ALV X-1
- Minotaur I
- Minotaur IV
- Minotaur V

ALV X-1 launch operated by Alliant Techsystems. Minotaur launches operated by Orbital Sciences Corporation from 2006 to 2013, and Northrop Grumman since 2020.

No.	Date	Time (UTC)	Launch vehicle	Payload	Result	Remarks
1	16 December 2006	12:00	Minotaur I	TacSat-2 and GeneSat-1	Success	Experimental satellite developed by the Air Force Research Laboratory. First launch from LP-0B and first Minotaur launch from the East Coast.
2	24 April 2007	06:48	Minotaur I	NFIRE	Success	Missile Defense Agency satellite aimed at analyzing rocket plumes.
3	22 August 2008	09:10	ALV X-1	Hy-BoLT and SOAREX-VI	Failure	Suborbital launch. Carried two hypersonics payloads for NASA. Only flight of the ATK Launch Vehicle. Range safety protocols engaged 20 seconds into launch after veering off-course.
4	19 May 2009	23:55	Minotaur I	TacSat-3	Success	Experimental satellite developed by the Air Force Research Laboratory.
5	30 June 2011	03:09	Minotaur I	ORS-1	Success	Reconnaissance satellite for the Operationally Responsive Space Office, also known as USA-231.
6	7 September 2013	03:27	Minotaur V	LADEE	Success	Lunar orbiter, aimed at studying the Moon and its atmosphere. Maiden flight of the Minotaur V and the first orbital civilian launch from LP-0B. First flight from Wallops to go to another celestial body.
7	20 November 2013	01:15	Minotaur I	ORS 3 and STPSat-3	Success	Reconnaissance satellite for the Operationally Responsive Space Office.
8	15 July 2020	13:46	Minotaur IV	NROL-129	Success	NRO launch. Four unknown satellites, also known as USA-305 to USA-308. First Minotaur IV flight from Wallops, and first launch for the National Reconnaissance Office from Wallops.
9	15 June 2021	13:35	Minotaur I	NROL-111	Success	NRO launch. Three unknown satellites, also known as USA-316 to USA 318.

=== LC-2 (LP-0C) ===
- Electron
- Electron (HASTE)

All launches operated by Rocket Lab.

No.	Date	Time (UTC)	Launch vehicle	Mission	Payload	Result	Remarks
1	24 January 2023	23:00	Electron	"Virginia Is For Launch Lovers"	HawkEye 360 Cluster 6	Success	First launch from LC-2/LP-0C, and first Electron launch from the United States.
2	16 March 2023	22:39	Electron	"Stronger Together"	Capella 9 and Capella 10	Success	
3	18 June 2023	01:25	Electron (HASTE)	"Scout's Arrow"	DYNAMO-A	Success	Suborbital launch. First flight of Electron in the Hypersonic Accelerator Suborbital Test Electron (HASTE) configuration.
4	21 March 2024	07:25	Electron	"Live and Let Fly"	NROL-123	Success	NRO launch. Also known as RASR-5, containing four satellites including USA-352. First orbital military launch from LC-2.
5	24 November 2024	06:00	Electron (HASTE)	"HASTE A La Vista"	MACH-TB	Success	First of four HASTE launches for Leidos and the Multi-Service Advanced Capability Hypersonics Test Bed project.
6	14 December 2024	01:00	Electron (HASTE)	"Stonehenge"	Unknown	Success	
7	23 September 2025	00:00	Electron (HASTE)	"Jenna"	Unknown	Success	
8	1 October 2025	00:28	Electron (HASTE)	"Justin"	Unknown	Success	
9	18 November 2025	13:00	Electron (HASTE)	"Prometheus Run"	Van	Success	Primary payload "Van" developed by the Applied Physics Laboratory, which tested key technologies for missile defense applications.
10	18 December 2025	05:03	Electron	"Don't Be Such A Square"	STP-S30	Success	
11	28 February 2026	00:00	Electron (HASTE)	"That's Not A Knife"	DART AE	Success	
12	22 April 2026	01:36	Electron (HASTE)	"Bubbles"	Unknown	Success	
13	11 June 2026	08:00	Electron (HASTE)	"Curveball"	Unknown	Success	First HASTE launch to reach orbit.

== See also ==
- Mid-Atlantic Regional Spaceport Launch Pad 0
- Orbital Sciences Corporation
- Rocket Lab
