= Cygnus NG-19 =

Late 2023 cargo spacecraft mission to ISS

NG-19
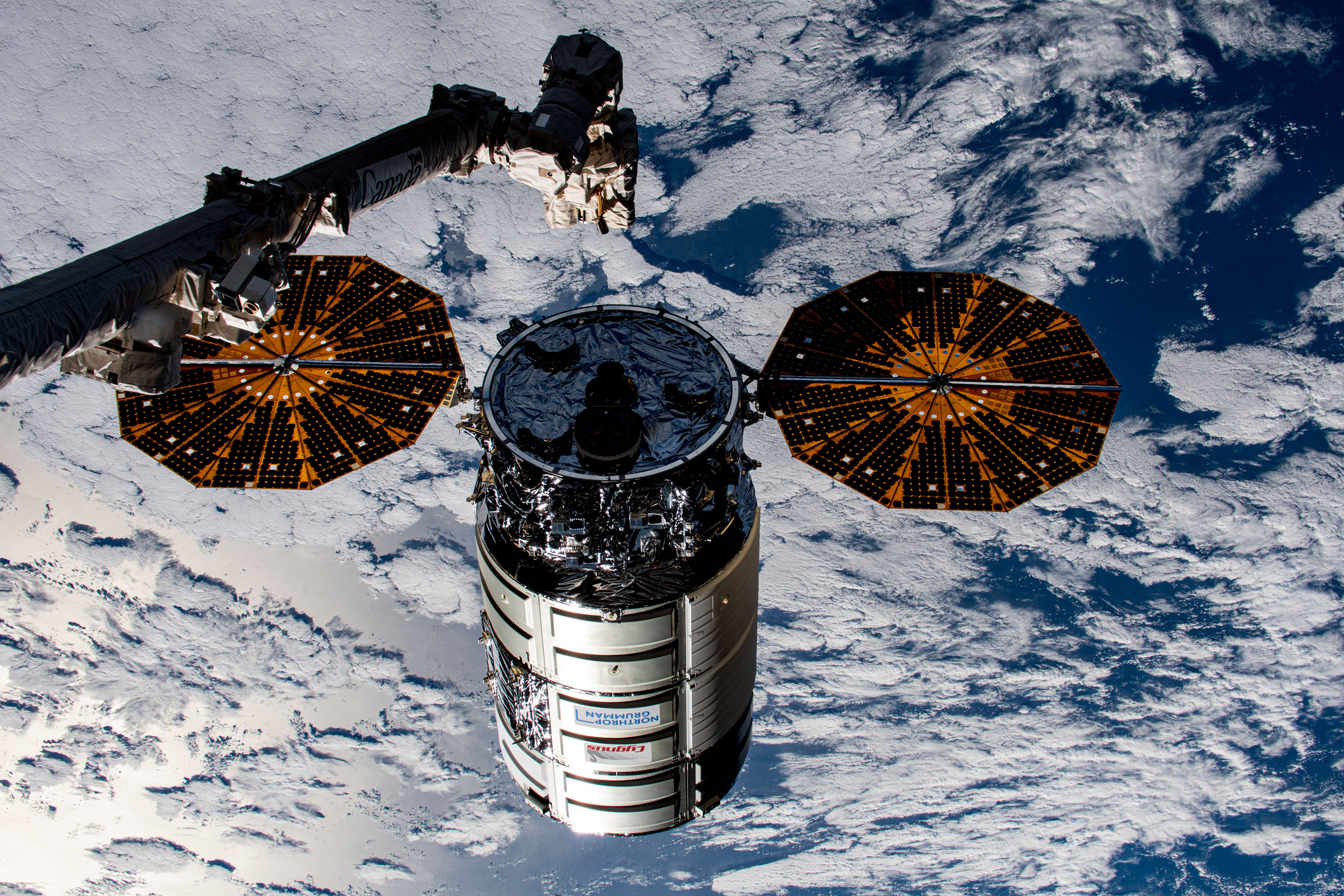
- Cygnus S.S. Laurel Clark after arrival at the ISS
- Names: CRS NG-19
- Mission type: ISS resupply
- Operator: Northrop Grumman
- COSPAR ID: 2023-110A
- SATCAT no.: 57488
- Website: NG-19
- Mission duration: 160 days, 17 hours, 50 minutes

Spacecraft properties
- Spacecraft: S.S. Laurel Clark
- Spacecraft type: Enhanced Cygnus
- Manufacturer: Northrop Grumman; Thales Alenia Space
- Launch mass: 8,050 kg (17,750 lb)
- Payload mass: 3,785 kg (8,344 lb)

Start of mission
- Launch date: 2 August 2023, 00:31:14 UTC (8:31:14 pm EDT)
- Rocket: Antares 230+
- Launch site: MARS, Pad 0A

End of mission
- Disposal: Deorbited
- Decay date: 9 January 2024, 18:22 UTC

Orbital parameters
- Reference system: Geocentric orbit
- Regime: Low Earth orbit
- Inclination: 51.66°

Berthing at ISS
- Berthing port: Unity nadir
- RMS capture: 4 August 2023, 09:52 UTC
- Berthing date: 4 August 2023, 12:28 UTC
- Unberthing date: 22 December 2023, 10:00 UTC
- RMS release: 22 December 2023, 13:06 UTC
- Time berthed: 139 days, 21 hours, 32 minutes

Cargo
- Mass: 3,785 kg (8,344 lb)
- Pressurised: 3,749 kg (8,265 lb)
- Unpressurised: 36 kg (79 lb)
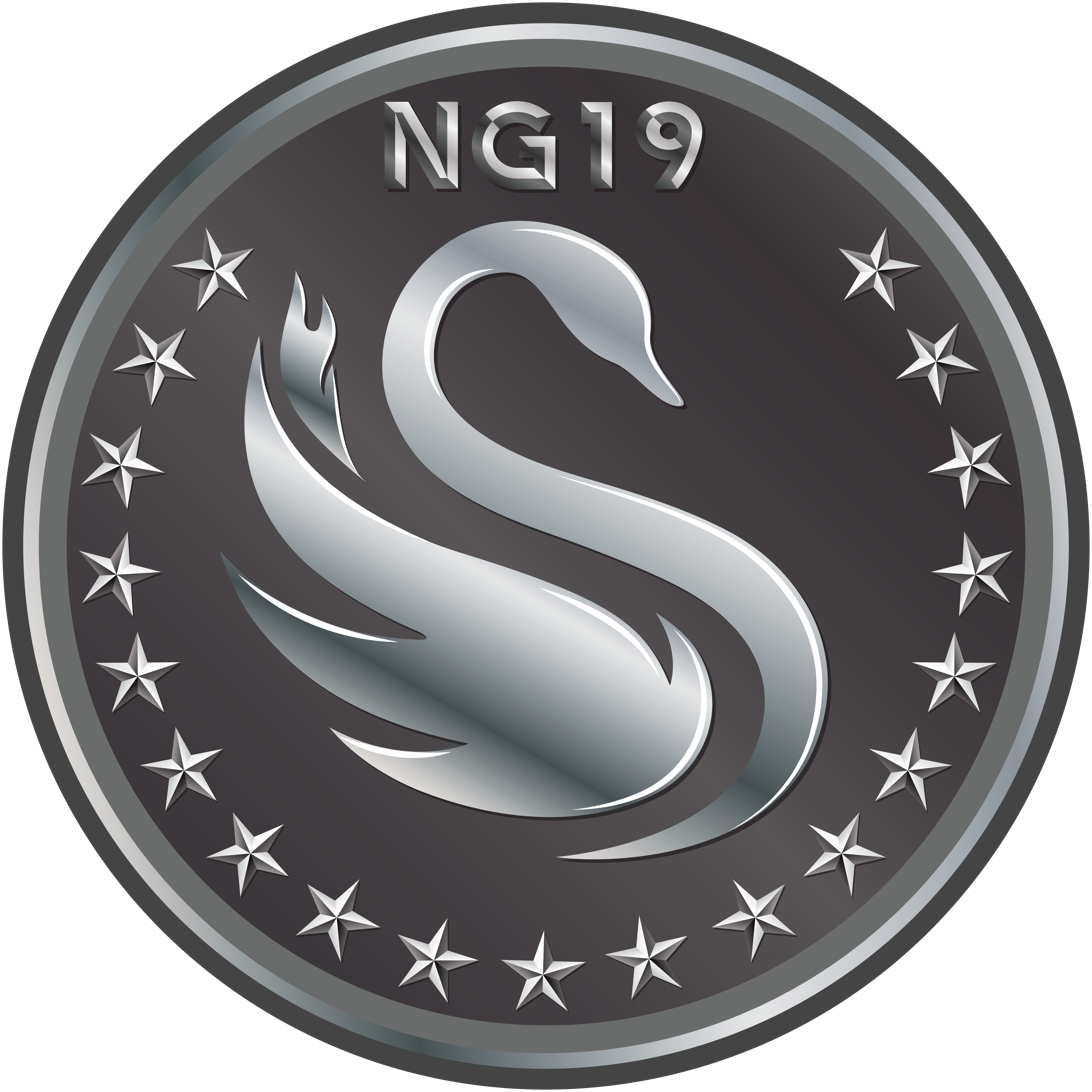
- Cygnus NG-19 mission patch Commercial Resupply Services Cygnus flights

NG-19 was the nineteenth flight of the Northrop Grumman robotic resupply spacecraft Cygnus and its eighteenth flight to the International Space Station (ISS) under the Commercial Resupply Services (CRS-2) contract with NASA. The mission launched on 2 August 2023 at 00:31:14 UTC. This was the eighth launch of Cygnus under the CRS-2 contract.

Orbital ATK (now Northrop Grumman Innovation Systems) and NASA jointly developed a new space transportation system to provide commercial cargo resupply services to the International Space Station (ISS). Under the Commercial Orbital Transportation Services (COTS) program, Orbital ATK designed, acquired, built, and assembled these components: Antares, a medium-class launch vehicle; Cygnus, an advanced spacecraft using a Pressurized Cargo Module (PCM) provided by industrial partner Thales Alenia Space and a Service Module based on the Orbital GEOStar satellite bus.

This flight used the last remaining Antares 200 series LV, which was constructed in Ukraine and uses Russian motors. The next three Cygnus missions will use Falcon 9, and subsequent mission will use the next-generation Antares 300 series that does not depend on Ukrainian or Russian parts.

== History ==
Cygnus NG-19 was the eighth Cygnus mission under the Commercial Resupply Services-2 contract. Northrop Grumman Innovation Systems confirmed on 23 February 2021 that Thales Alenia Space of Turin, Italy, will fabricate two additional Pressurized Cargo Modules (PCMs) for a pair of forthcoming Commercial Resupply Services-2 missions. Current plans are for the two additional Cygnus spacecraft to be designated NG-18 and NG-19.

Production and integration of Cygnus spacecraft are performed in Dulles, Virginia. The Cygnus service module is mated with the pressurized cargo module at the launch site, and mission operations are conducted from control centers in Dulles, Virginia and Houston, Texas.

== Spacecraft ==
This was the fourteenth flight of the Enhanced-sized Cygnus PCM.

== Manifest ==
The Cygnus spacecraft was loaded with a total of 3,785 kilograms (8,344 lb) of cargo and supplies before its launch, including 3,749 kilograms (8,265 lb) of pressurized and 36 kilograms (79 lb) of unpressurized cargo.

The cargo manifest is broken down as follows:

- Crew supplies: 1,590 kg (3,510 lb)
- Science investigations: 1,128 kg (2,487 lb)
- Spacewalk equipment: 52 kg (115 lb)
- Vehicle hardware: 948 kg (2,090 lb)
- Computer resources: 31 kg (68 lb)

== Research ==
The new experiments arriving at the orbiting laboratory will inspire future scientists and explorers, and provide valuable insight for researchers.

NASA Scientific Research studies:

- Innovative Paralysis Therapy Enabling Neuroregeneration (Neuronix) - Sponsored by the ISS National Lab, demonstrates the formation of 3D neuron cell cultures in microgravity and tests a neuron-specific gene therapy. Gene therapy shows promise as a potential treatment for people with paralysis and neurological diseases such as Alzheimer’s and Parkinson’s, but the 3D models needed to test these therapies cannot be grown in Earth’s gravity. Creating 3D cell cultures in microgravity could provide a platform for drug discovery and gene therapy testing.
- Spacecraft Fire Experiments (Saffire-VI) - Understanding how fire behaves in space is vital for developing fire prevention and fire suppression methods, but flame-related experiments are difficult to conduct aboard an occupied spacecraft. The Spacecraft Fire Experiments (Saffire) use the Cygnus resupply craft after it leaves the space station to remove the risk to crew and spacecraft. Saffire-VI is the last of this series, building on previous results to test flammability at different oxygen levels and to demonstrate fire detection and monitoring as well as post-fire cleanup capabilities.
- Exploration Potable Water Dispenser (Exploration PWD) - Uses advanced water sanitization and microbial growth reduction methods and dispenses hot water. This is an improved version of a system that was launched in fall 2008.
- MVP-Cell-02A - Sponsored by the NASA Biological and Physical Sciences Division (BPS), MVP-Cell-02A is a study aimed at understanding how organisms evolve to adapt to the space environment. During the experiment, Bacillus subtilis bacteria will be grown in specially designed environmental hardware in a range of conditions, allowing researchers to investigate whether the adaptation process occurs differently in microgravity and in the spaceflight environment as a whole. MVP-Cell-02A is a repeat of MVP-Cell-02.

== See also ==
- Uncrewed spaceflights to the International Space Station
