= Virginia Spaceport Authority =

Political subdivision of Virginia

- Logo of the Virginia Spaceport Authority.

Agency overview
- Formed: July 1, 1995
- Jurisdiction: Commonwealth of Virginia
- Headquarters: 4111 Monarch Way, Norfolk, VA 23508 (Headquarters) 7414 Atlantic Rd, Wallops Island, VA 23337 (MARS)
- Agency executives: Ted Mercer, Executive Director; Sean Mulligan, Deputy Executive Director; Alan Brittingham, Spaceport General Manager
- Website: vaspace.org virginia.gov/agencies/virginia-commercial-space-flight-authority

The Virginia Spaceport Authority, also known as Virginia Space, is a political subdivision of the Commonwealth of Virginia headquartered in Norfolk, Virginia, focused on bringing commercial spaceflight to Virginia and providing education in aerospace technologies across the Commonwealth. Created in 1995 as the Virginia Commercial Space Flight Authority (VCSFA) by the Virginia General Assembly, Virginia Space owns and operates the Mid-Atlantic Regional Spaceport (MARS) on Wallops Island, located within the Wallops Flight Facility. The subdivision assumed its current name in April 2023.

== History ==
The Virginia General Assembly created the Virginia Commercial Space Flight Authority in 1995 to promote the development of the commercial space flight industry, economic development, aerospace research, and science, technology, engineering, and math (STEM) education throughout the Commonwealth.

Initially partnered with Old Dominion University, which helped develop the organization, longtime professor Dr. Billie M. Reed was installed as the Executive Director of the organization. Prior to his time as a professor, he retired from the United States Navy after twenty years of service.

In 1997, Virginia Space entered into a Reimbursable Space Act Agreement with the National Aeronautics and Space Administration (NASA), which provided for permitted use of land on NASA Wallops Island. Virginia Space also applied for and was granted a Federal Aviation Administration (FAA) license to launch to orbit. The Wallops Island location was first sanctioned in 1945 by NASA's predecessor, the National Advisory Committee for Aeronautics, for spaceflight.

With these foundations in place, the Virginia Space Flight Center was founded, located on the southern portion of NASA Wallops Island. In present-day, the facility is approved for launch azimuths from 38° to 60°, making it an ideal location from which to launch to the International Space Station (ISS).

By the end of 2003, Governor Mark Warner and Governor Bob Ehrlich, respectively of Virginia and Maryland, partnered to establish the Mid-Atlantic Regional Spaceport (MARS), succeeding the Virginia Space Flight Center. This was done, in part, to help develop the region's presence for space flight and collaboration with the local universities. Senator Barbara Mikulski of Maryland was a long-time advocate for the advancement of this intra-state partnership during her time in office.

In 2007, NASA selected the Virginia-based Orbital Sciences Corporation to participate in the Commercial Orbital Transportation Services (COTS) program, followed by a Commercial Resupply Services (CRS) contract to build and demonstrate a new rocket, Antares, to resupply the ISS. This project was taken over by Orbital's successor company Northrop Grumman Innovation Systems. The CRS contract authorized eight missions from 2012 to 2015 carrying approximately 20,000 kg of cargo to the ISS, as well as disposal of waste, from the MARS Pad-0A launchpad.

In March 2012, it was announced that Dr. Reed was going to retire from his role at Virginia Space, with Dale Nash, a former executive officer at Alaska Aerospace Corporation, set as his immediate successor.

On MARS Pad-0B, Virginia Space made modifications and upgrades to launch the NASA Lunar Atmosphere and Dust Environment Explorer (LADEE) mission to the Moon in mid-2013 on a new Orbital Sciences Minotaur V launch vehicle. Also in mid-2013, the United States Air Force launched ORS-3 from MARS Pad 0B.

In October 2018, VCSFA entered into an agreement with the New Zealand-based Rocket Lab to build a new pad for their Electron rocket. This was followed in 2021 by announcing their Neutron rocket will also be set to launch from the MARS facility. With their main launchpad located in the Māhia Peninsula of New Zealand, Rocket Lab refers to their MARS location as "Launch Complex 2".

In 2021, Virginia governor Ralph Northam announced the selection of Major General Roosevelt "Ted" Mercer (Retired) as the new Executive Director of Virginia Space, succeeding Dale Nash, who previously announced his retirement after working in that position since 2012. General Mercer took office in August 2021.

== Facilities ==
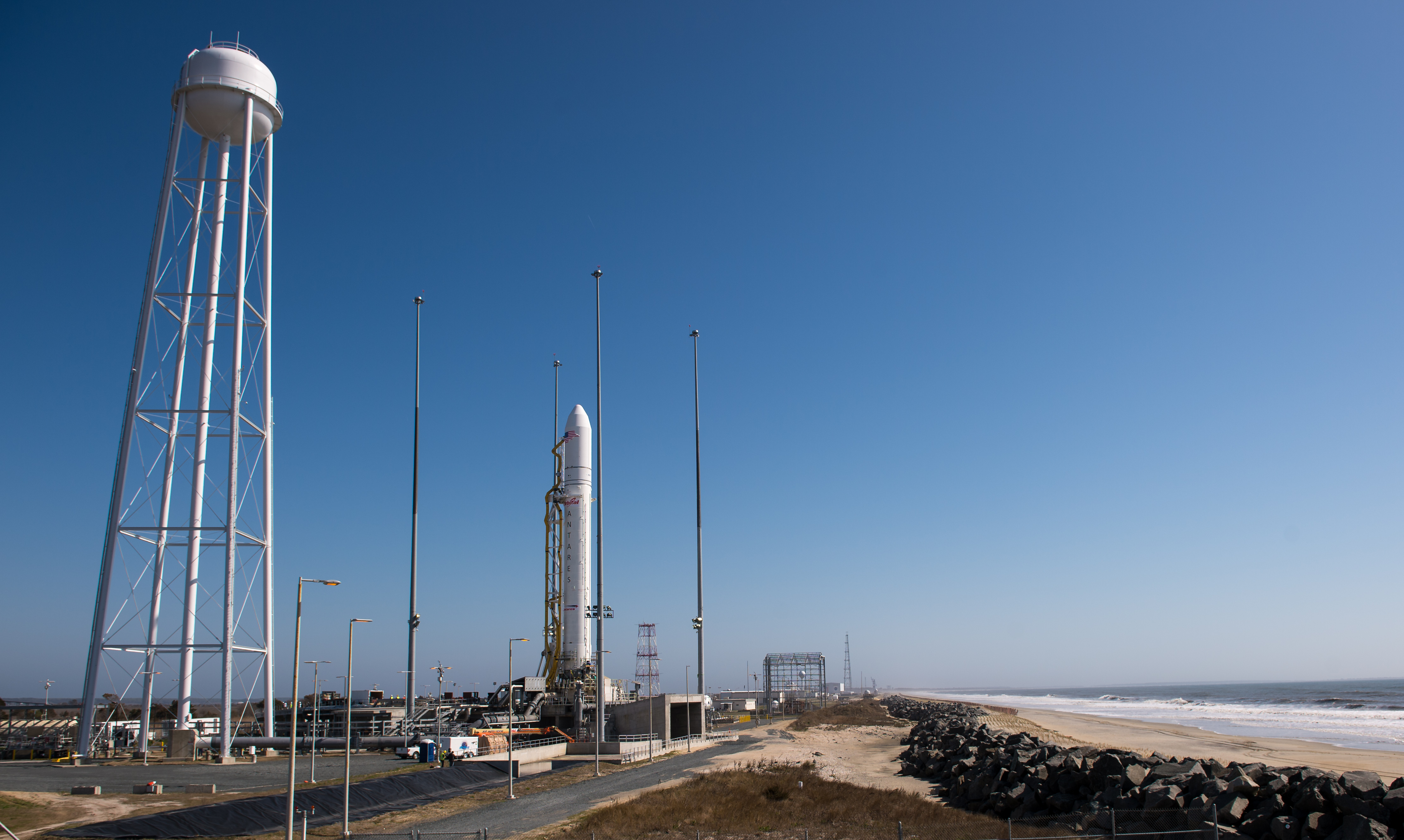
The launch pad 0A with Antares rocket. At left is a water tower for supplying water for sound suppression.

The Mid-Atlantic Regional Spaceport has two active launch pads. A third is launch pad was completed in December 2019.

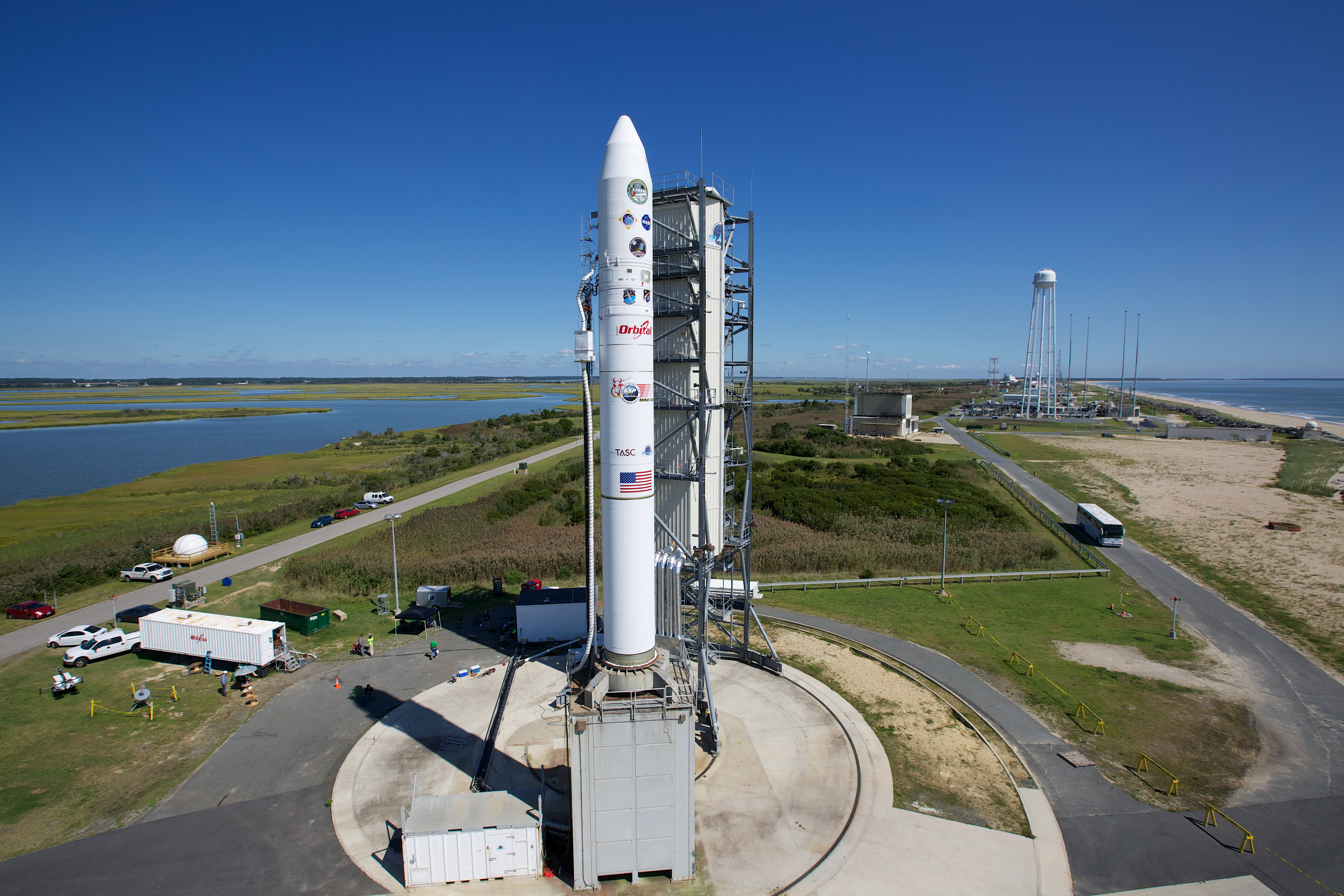
The launch pad 0B with Minotaur V rocket in September 2013.

Launch pad 0A (LP-0A) was built for the Conestoga rocket, which made its only flight in 1995. The launch tower was subsequently demolished in September 2008, and has now been rebuilt for use by the Northrop Grumman Innovation Systems Antares. The pad modifications for Antares included the construction of a Horizontal Integration Facility for launcher/payload mating and a wheeled transporter/erector that will "roll out and erect the rocket on its launch pad about 24 hours prior to launch".

The facility suffered significant damage during the 28 October 2014 Antares launch failure, according to NASA officials in the immediate aftermath. The Commonwealth of Virginia is seeking help from its two US Senators to obtain Federal funding for rebuilding the pad. Preliminary estimates for rebuilding the pad indicate the cost should be no more than US$20 million. By May 2015, that estimate had been revised down to US$13 million and repairs were expected to be completed by September or October 2015 with the next planned launch in March 2016. On September 30, 2015, the spaceport announced repairs on pad 0A had been completed. The launch pad resumed flight operations with the successful Cygnus CRS OA-5 mission on October 17, 2016.

Launch Pad 0B (LP-0B) became operational in 1999, and was subsequently upgraded with the construction of a mobile service tower, which was completed in 2004. It remains active, and is currently used by Minotaur rockets. Additionally, Vector Space Systems announced on October 19, 2017 that their upcoming Vector-R rocket will be conducting three launches in the next two years, with an option for 5 additional launches, from a mobile launcher at pad 0B.

In October 2018, Virginia Space announced the construction on MARS Launch Pad 0C (also known as LP-0C or LC-2) and an associated integration facility for use by Rocket Lab for their Electron rocket. The design is largely based on the company's Launch Complex 1 on the Māhia Peninsula of New Zealand. The first launch from this new Wallops launch complex occurred on January 24, 2023.
