= Cygnus OA-5 =

Late 2016 cargo mission to the ISS

OA-5
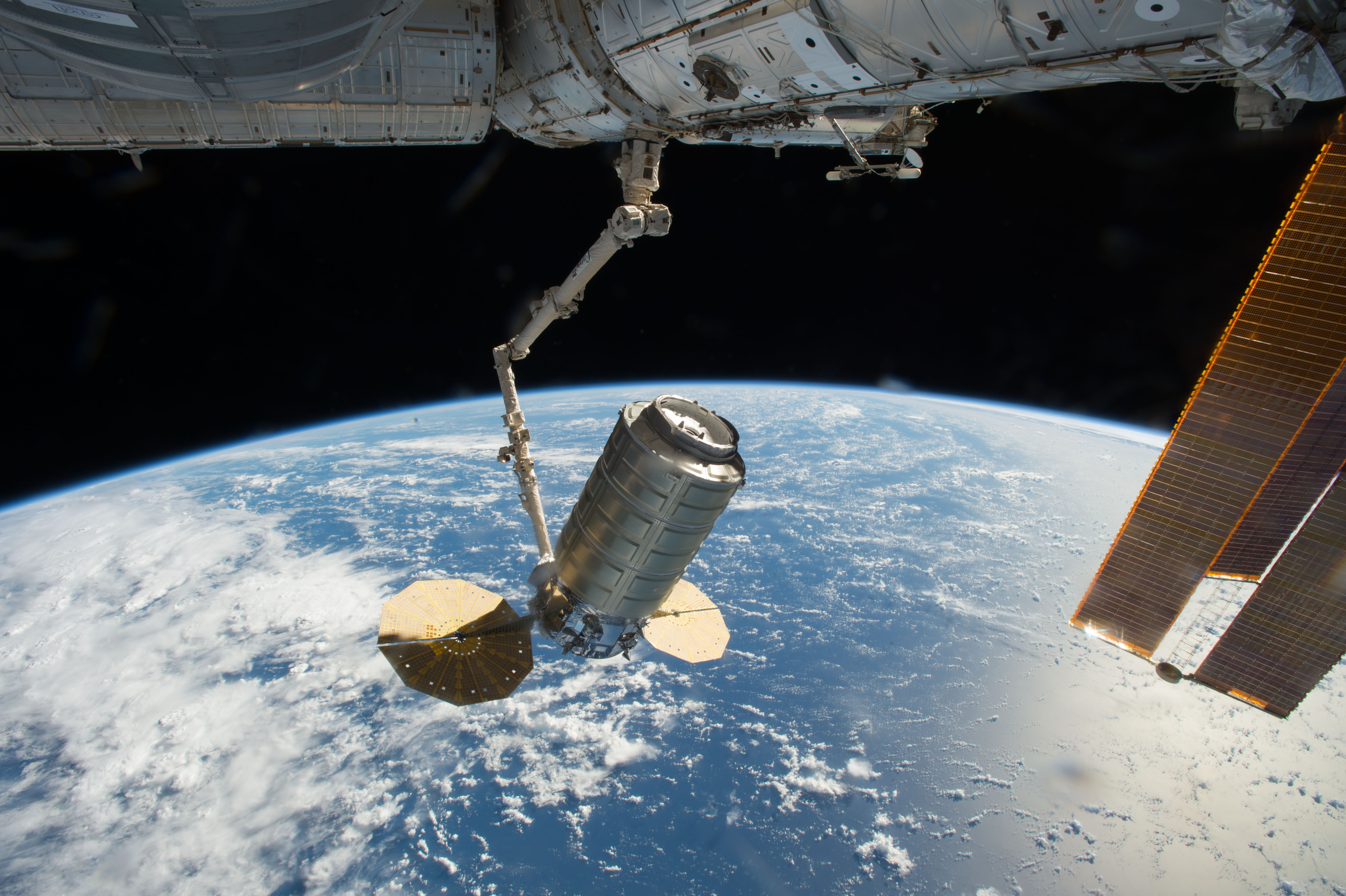
- Canadarm2 grapples the S.S. Alan Poindexter.
- Names: CRS OA-5; CRS Orb-5 (2008–2015); Orbital-5 (2008–2015)
- Mission type: ISS resupply
- Operator: Orbital ATK
- COSPAR ID: 2016-062A
- SATCAT no.: 41818
- Mission duration: 40 days, 23 hours, 51 minutes

Spacecraft properties
- Spacecraft: S.S. Alan Poindexter
- Spacecraft type: Enhanced Cygnus
- Manufacturer: Orbital ATK; Thales Alenia Space
- Launch mass: 6,172 kg (13,607 lb)

Start of mission
- Launch date: 17 October 2016, 23:45:36 UTC (7:45:36 pm EDT)
- Rocket: Antares 230
- Launch site: MARS, Pad 0A

End of mission
- Disposal: Deorbited
- Decay date: 27 November 2016, 23:36 UTC

Orbital parameters
- Reference system: Geocentric
- Regime: Low Earth
- Inclination: 51.66°

Berthing at ISS
- Berthing port: Unity nadir
- RMS capture: 23 October 2016, 11:28 UTC
- Berthing date: 23 October 2016, 14:53 UTC
- Unberthing date: 21 November 2016, 11:25 UTC
- RMS release: 21 November 2016, 13:22 UTC
- Time berthed: 28 days, 20 hours, 32 minutes

Cargo
- Mass: 2,425 kg (5,346 lb)
- Pressurised: 2,342 kg (5,163 lb)
- Unpressurised: 83 kg (183 lb)
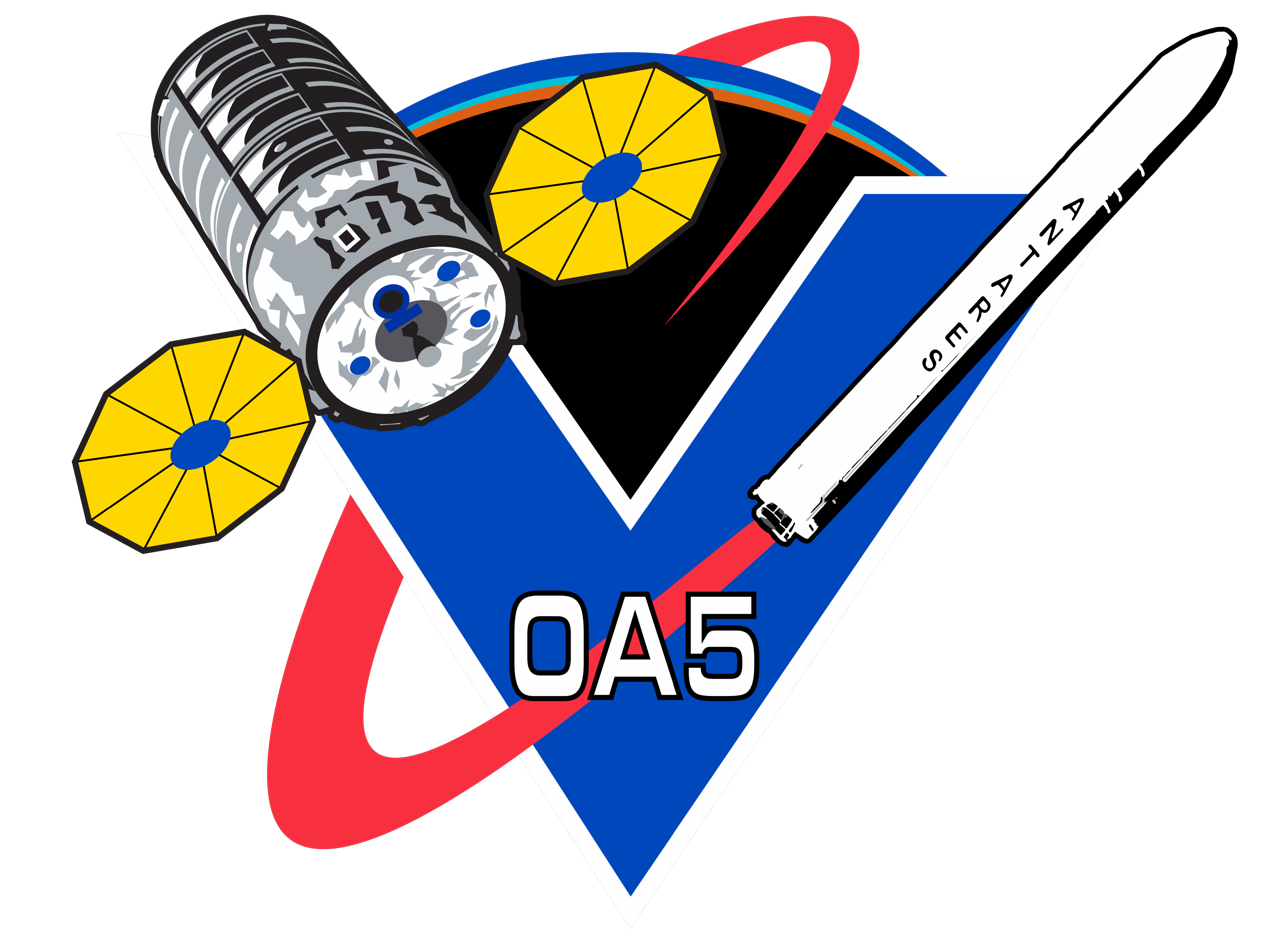
- NASA (left) and Orbital ATK (right) insignias Commercial Resupply Services Cygnus flights

OA-5, previously known as Orbital-5, was the seventh planned flight of the Orbital Sciences' uncrewed resupply spacecraft Cygnus and its sixth flight to the International Space Station under the Commercial Resupply Services contract with NASA. The mission launched on 17 October 2016 at 23:45:36 UTC. Orbital Sciences and NASA jointly developed a new space transportation system to provide commercial cargo resupply services to the International Space Station (ISS). Under the Commercial Orbital Transportation System (COTS) program, Orbital designed and built Antares, a medium-class launch vehicle; Cygnus, an advanced maneuvering spacecraft; and a Pressurized Cargo Module which is provided by Orbital's industrial partner Thales Alenia Space.

The Cygnus spacecraft for this mission is named the S.S. Alan Poindexter in honor to astronaut Alan G. Poindexter, a deceased Space Shuttle commander. Poindexter was selected in the 1998 NASA Group (G17) and went into orbit aboard Space Shuttle missions STS-122 and STS-131.

== History ==
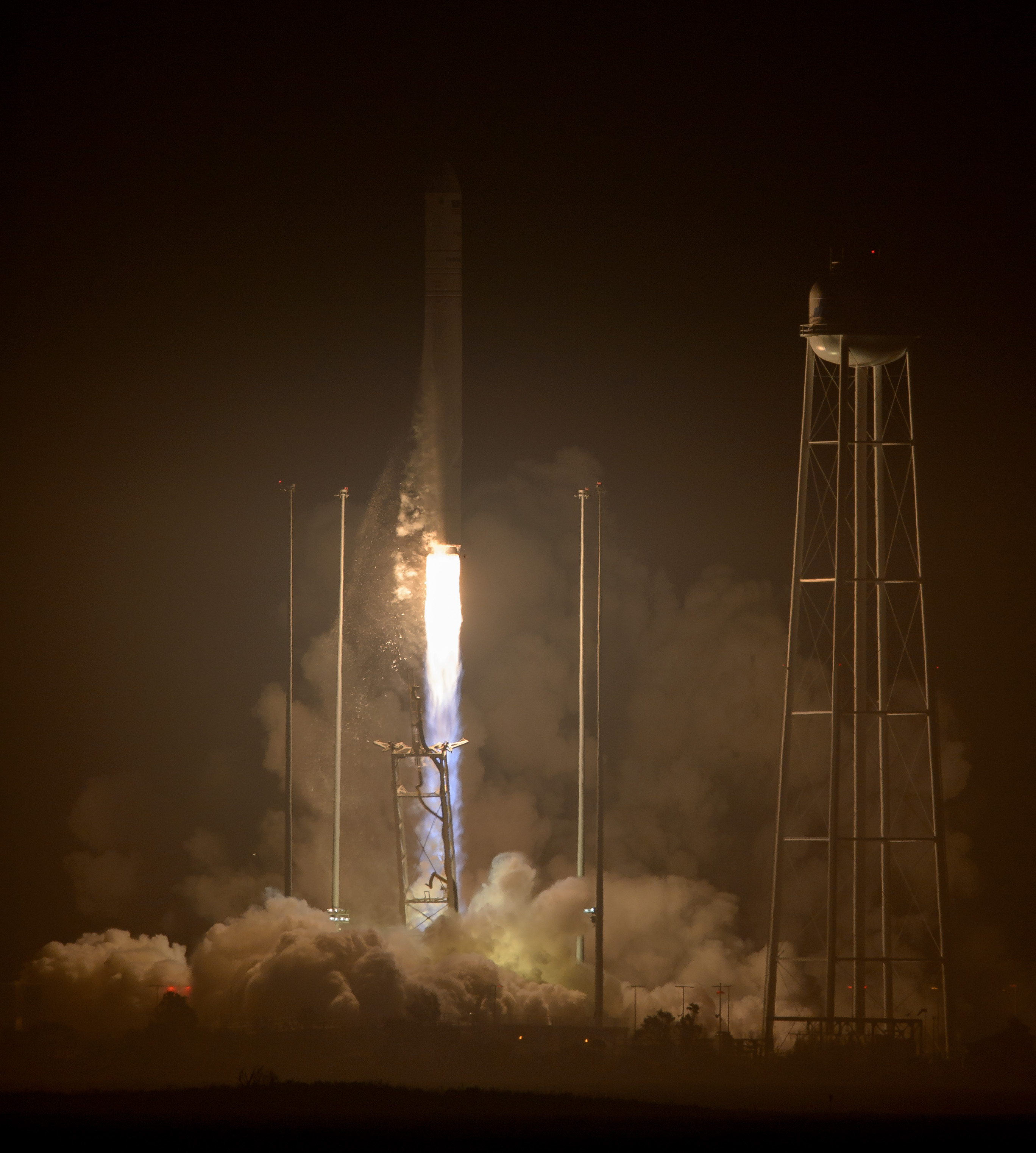
Launch of the OA-5 mission on 17 October 2016.

The COTS demonstration mission was successfully conducted in September 2013, and Orbital commenced operational ISS cargo missions under the Commercial Resupply Service (CRS) program with two missions in 2014. Regrettably, the third operational mission, Cygnus Orb-3, was not successful due to spectacular Antares failure during launch. The company decided to discontinue the Antares 100 series and accelerate the introduction of a new propulsion system. The Antares system is being upgraded with newly built RD-181 first stage engines to provide greater payload performance and increased reliability.

In late 2014, Orbital Sciences contracted United Launch Alliance for an Atlas V launch of Cygnus CRS OA-4 in late 2015 from Cape Canaveral, Florida, and with a second Atlas V launch of Cygnus in 2016. The company plans three Cygnus missions in 2016, in the first (Cygnus CRS OA-6), third (Cygnus CRS OA-5) and fourth quarters (Cygnus OA-7) of 2016. The Cygnus OA-5 and OA-7 will fly on the new Antares 230 and OA-6 will fly on second Atlas V in first quarter of 2016. These three missions enable Orbital ATK to fulfill their CRS contracted payload obligation. This particular mission is known as OA-5.

Production and integration of Cygnus spacecraft is performed in Dulles, Virginia. The Cygnus service module is mated with the pressurized cargo module at the launch site, and mission operations are conducted from control centers in Dulles, Virginia and Houston, Texas.

== Spacecraft ==
This was the sixth of ten flights by Orbital ATK under the Commercial Resupply Services (CRS) contract with NASA. This was the third flight of the Enhanced sized Cygnus PCM. The mission successfully launched on 17 October 2016, 23:45 UTC.

In keeping with an Orbital ATK tradition, this Cygnus spacecraft is named the S.S. Alan Poindexter after the NASA astronaut who flew aboard the Space Shuttle twice (2008 and 2010).

== Manifest ==
Total cargo mass on ascent: 2,425 kg (5,346 lb)

- Pressurized cargo with packaging: 2,342 kg (5,163 lb)
  - Science investigations: 498 kg (1,098 lb)
  - Crew supplies: 585 kg (1,290 lb)
  - Vehicle hardware: 1,023 kg (2,255 lb)
  - Spacewalk equipment: 5 kg (11 lb)
  - Computer resources: 56 kg (123 lb)
  - Russian hardware: 42 kg (93 lb)
- Unpressurized cargo (CubeSats): 83 kg (183 lb)
- Total cargo on descent (destructive): 1,687 kg (3,719 lb)

== Other OA projects ==
NASA had planned the next Cygnus flight, Cygnus CRS OA-7, for 30 December 2016. However, in October 2016, it was announced that OA-7 was being delayed until March 2017 and switched from the Antares launch vehicle to a United Launch Alliance Atlas V rocket to provide additional cargo up mass for NASA.

In 2015, under the NASA CRS-1 contract, Orbital Sciences was awarded three extension flights for 2017 and 2018. The Cygnus CRS OA-8E flight has tentatively been scheduled for 12 June 2017, followed by Cygnus OA-9E later that year and OA-10E in 2018. Cargo vehicle scheduling is dynamic with the ISS partners. The schedule will be influenced by the first USA crewed commercial flights (SpaceX, Boeing) to ISS since Space Shuttle retirement in 2011.

== Cubesat release ==
On 25 November 2016, after leaving the ISS, the spacecraft raised its orbit to 500 kilometers and released four Lemur-2 cubesats for Spire Global.

== See also ==
- Uncrewed spaceflights to the International Space Station
