= Cygnus OA-6 =

Early 2016 cargo mission to the ISS

OA-6
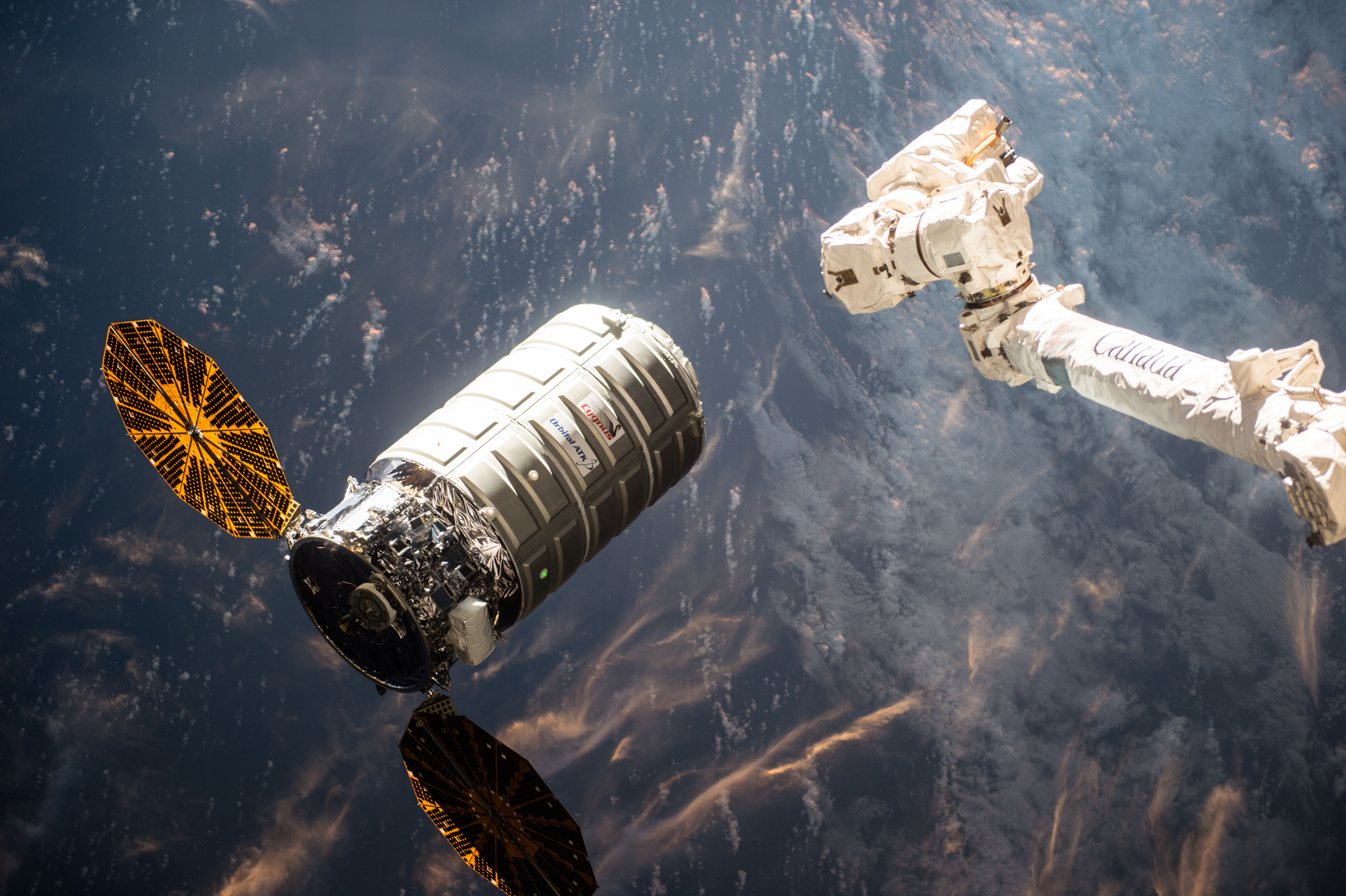
- Canadarm2 approaches the S.S. Rick Husband.
- Names: CRS OA-6; CRS Orb-6 (2008–2015); Orbital-6 (2008–2015)
- Mission type: ISS resupply
- Operator: Orbital ATK
- COSPAR ID: 2016-019A
- SATCAT no.: 41393
- Mission duration: 91 days, 10 hours, 23 minutes

Spacecraft properties
- Spacecraft: S.S. Rick Husband
- Spacecraft type: Enhanced Cygnus
- Manufacturer: Orbital ATK; Thales Alenia Space
- Launch mass: 7,492 kg (16,517 lb)
- Payload mass: 3,513 kg (7,745 lb)

Start of mission
- Launch date: 23 March 2016, 03:05:52 UTC (22 March 2016, 11:05:52 pm EDT)
- Rocket: Atlas V 401 (AV-064)
- Launch site: Cape Canaveral, SLC‑41
- Contractor: United Launch Alliance

End of mission
- Disposal: Deorbited
- Decay date: 22 June 2016, 13:29 UTC

Orbital parameters
- Reference system: Geocentric orbit
- Regime: Low Earth orbit
- Inclination: 51.66°

Berthing at ISS
- Berthing port: Unity nadir
- RMS capture: 26 March 2016, 10:51 UTC
- Berthing date: 26 March 2016, 14:52 UTC
- Unberthing date: 14 June 2016, 11:43 UTC
- RMS release: 14 June 2016, 13:30 UTC
- Time berthed: 79 days, 20 hours, 51 minutes
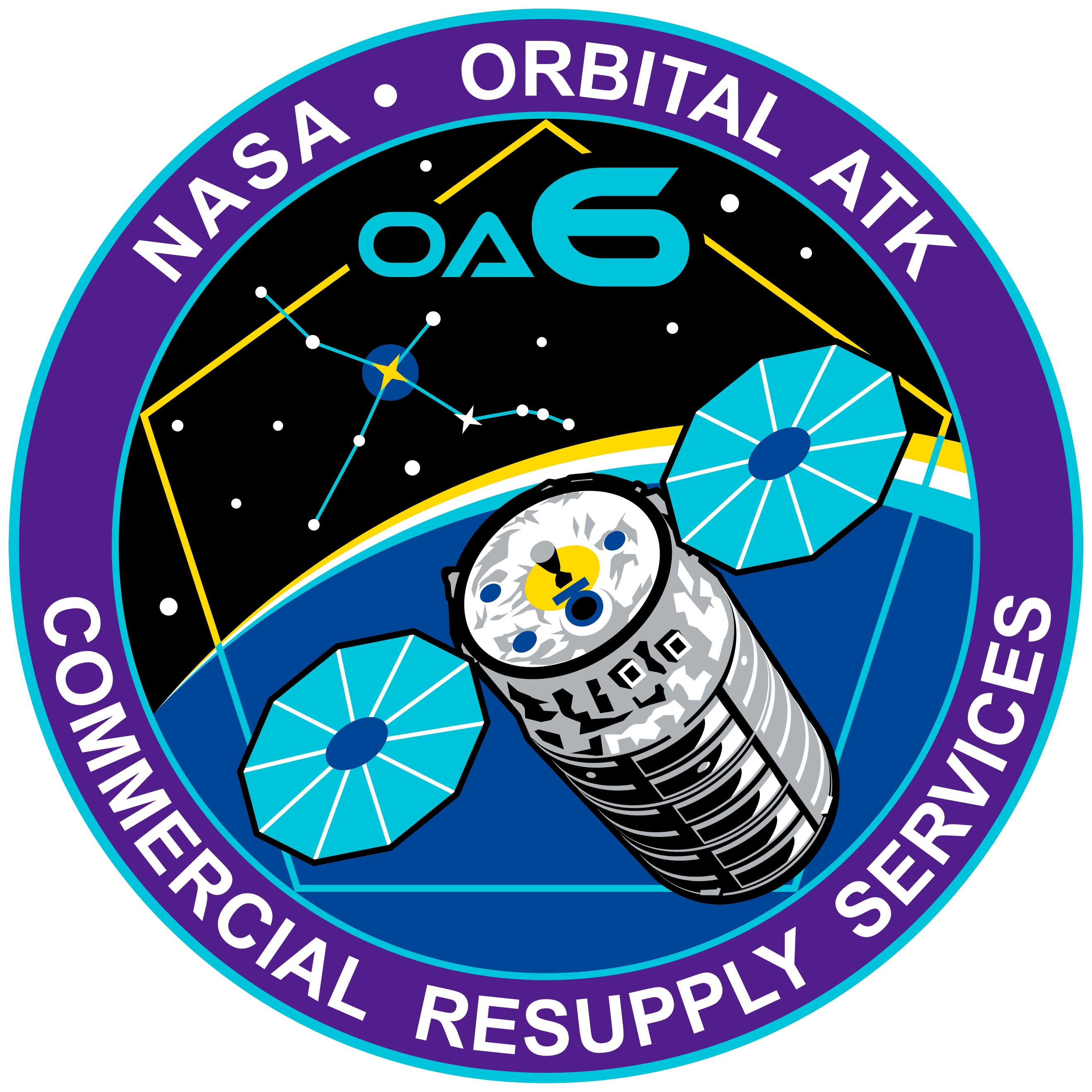
- NASA insignia Commercial Resupply Services Cygnus flights

OA-6, previously known as Orbital-6, is the sixth flight of the Orbital ATK uncrewed resupply spacecraft Cygnus and its fifth flight to the International Space Station under the Commercial Resupply Services (CRS) contract with NASA. The mission launched on 23 March 2016 at 03:05:52 UTC.

The Cygnus spacecraft for this mission is named the S.S. Rick Husband in honor of astronaut Rick Husband.

== History ==
The first COTS demonstration mission with a Cygnus concluded successfully in September 2013 and Orbital commenced operational ISS cargo missions under the Commercial Resupply Service (CRS) program with two missions in 2014. However, the third operational mission, Cygnus Orb-3, was unsuccessful due to catastrophic failure of its Antares 130 launch vehicle. Orbital discontinued the Antares 100 series in favor of the planned Antares 200, upgraded with newly built RD-181 first stage engines to provide greater payload performance and increased reliability.

While the Antares 200 was under development in 2015–2016, the company contracted with United Launch Alliance (ULA) for the Atlas V launch of Cygnus OA-4, which occurred on 6 December 2015, to be followed by the Atlas V launch of Cygnus OA-6 on 23 March 2016.

Future Orbital ATK launches of CRS OA-5 in August 2016 and CRS OA-7 in November 2016 would be on the new Antares 230. Together with CRS OA-6, these missions enabled Orbital ATK to cover their initial CRS contracted payload obligation.

Production and integration of Cygnus spacecraft was performed in Dulles, Virginia. The Cygnus service module was mated with the pressurized cargo module at the launch site, and mission operations were conducted from control centers in Dulles, Virginia and Houston, Texas.

== Launch ==
On 23 March 2016 (UTC), Cygnus CRS OA-6 was successfully launched by the Atlas V into low Earth orbit. During the flight, the rocket had a first-stage anomaly that led to shutdown of the first-stage engine approximately five seconds before anticipated. The anomaly forced the Centaur upper stage of the rocket to fire for approximately one minute longer than planned, using reserved fuel margin, but did not significantly impact payload orbital insertion. The preplanned deorbit burn successfully deorbited the stage, but not precisely within the designated location. The issue marked the first Atlas V anomaly in over eight years to be publicly acknowledged by ULA.

== Spacecraft ==
Cygnus OA-6 is the fifth of ten flights by Orbital ATK under the Commercial Resupply Services contract with NASA. This was the second flight of the Enhanced sized Cygnus PCM. The delay of the NOAA GOES-R satellite from March 2016 to October 2016 created this Atlas V launch opportunity for Cygnus OA-6 to be launched before Cygnus OA-5. The mission was launched on 23 March 2016.

In keeping with an Orbital ATK tradition, this Cygnus spacecraft is named the S.S. Rick Husband after the NASA astronaut who commanded the Space Shuttle Columbia's ill-fated STS-107 mission in 2003.

== Manifest ==
Total weight of cargo: 3,513 kg (7,745 lb) using Enhanced Cygnus.

- Crew supplies: 1,139 kg (2,511 lb)
  - Crew care packages
  - 169 Bulk overwrap bags of food
  - 6 Bulk overwrap bags of U.S. food for Russian crew
  - Hygiene towels for Russian crew
  - Printer ink and paper
- Vehicle hardware: 1,108 kg (2,443 lb)
  - Multiplexer-demultiplexer circuit cards
  - Charcoal, brine and bacteria filters for ECLESS
  - Water sampling kit
  - Toilet inserts, urine receptacle with hose, toilet paper
- Science and research: 777 kg (1,713 lb)
  - 20 Flock 2e' CubeSats
  - Human Research Program resupply
  - METEOR
- Computer resources: 98 kg (216 lb)
  - New ZBook laptop and printer
  - 160 GB hard drive for IBM ThinkPad
  - Canon XH camcorder, Ghost camera, Nikon cameras, 50 mm lens, USB card reader
  - Assorted cables
- EVA (Spacewalk) gear: 157 kg (346 lb)
  - Legs, boots, arms and hard upper torso for spacesuit
  - Socket caddy assembly
  - METOX canisters for carbon dioxide removal
  - Contamination detection kit

== Saffire-1 ==
Saffire-1 is a NASA test to study flammability and fire propagation in space, using the CRS OA-6 after it has delivered cargo to the International Space Station. The spacecraft is fitted with various sensors and cameras to record data during what is expected to be a 20-minute fire, to determine how much fire resistance is needed in the ultra-light material used in the spacecraft and astronaut's gear. Cygnus OA-6 will later disintegrate as it enters the Earth's atmosphere.

== Other ORB projects ==
After this Cygnus OA-6 flight, NASA plans to launch two more Cygnus cargo missions in 2016: Cygnus OA-5 on 6 July 2016 and Cygnus OA-7 on 30 December 2016. They will be followed by three flights from the extended contract: Cygnus OA-8E on 12 June 2017, Cygnus OA-9E later in 2017 and Cygnus NG-10 in 2018. The schedules in early 2017 are dynamic, due to the first crewed commercial flights (SpaceX, Boeing) to ISS.

== See also ==
- Uncrewed spaceflights to the International Space Station
