= Cygnus OA-7 =

Early 2017 cargo mission to the ISS

OA-7
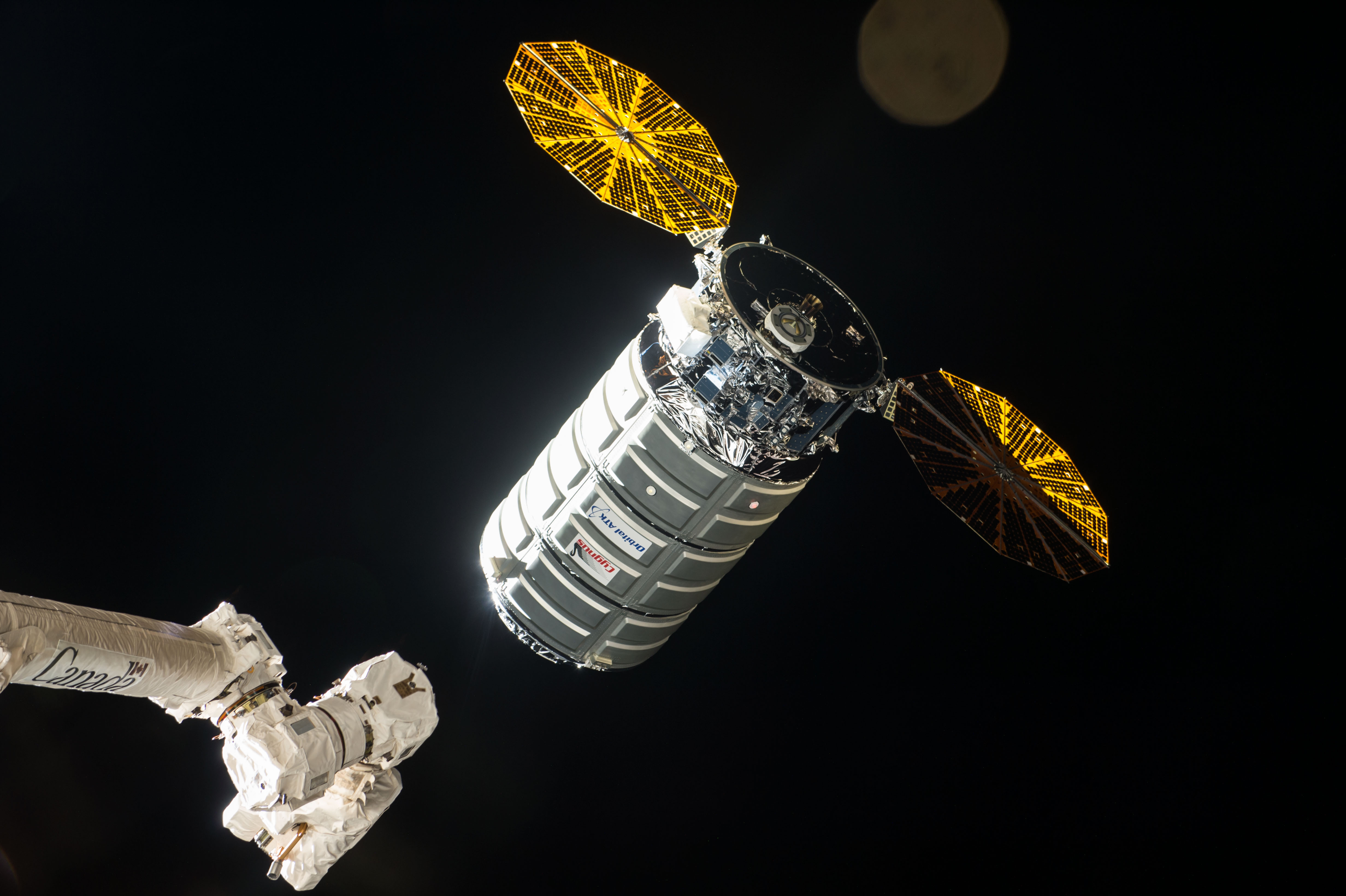
- Canadarm2 approaches the S.S. John Glenn
- Names: CRS OA-7; CRS Orb-7 (2008–2015); Orbital-7 (2008–2015)
- Mission type: ISS resupply
- Operator: Orbital ATK
- COSPAR ID: 2017-019A
- SATCAT no.: 42681
- Mission duration: 54 days, 1 hour, 56 minutes

Spacecraft properties
- Spacecraft: S.S. John Glenn
- Spacecraft type: Enhanced Cygnus
- Manufacturer: Orbital ATK; Thales Alenia Space
- Launch mass: 7,220 kg (15,920 lb)

Start of mission
- Launch date: 18 April 2017, 15:11:26 UTC (11:11:26 am EDT)
- Rocket: Atlas V 401 (AV-070)
- Launch site: Cape Canaveral, SLC‑41
- Contractor: United Launch Alliance

End of mission
- Disposal: Deorbited
- Decay date: 11 June 2017, 17:08 UTC

Orbital parameters
- Reference system: Geocentric orbit
- Regime: Low Earth orbit
- Inclination: 51.66°

Berthing at ISS
- Berthing port: Unity nadir
- RMS capture: 22 April 2017, 10:05 UTC
- Berthing date: 22 April 2017, 12:39 UTC
- Unberthing date: 4 June 2017, 11:05 UTC
- RMS release: 4 June 2017, 13:10 UTC
- Time berthed: 42 days, 22 hours, 26 minutes

Cargo
- Mass: 3,459 kg (7,626 lb)
- Pressurised: 3,376 kg (7,443 lb)
- Unpressurised: 83 kg (183 lb)
- NASA insignia Commercial Resupply Services Cygnus flights

OA-7, previously known as Orbital-7, is the eighth flight of the Orbital ATK uncrewed resupply spacecraft Cygnus and its seventh flight to the International Space Station (ISS) under the Commercial Resupply Services contract with NASA. The mission launched on 18 April 2017 at 15:11:26 UTC. Orbital and NASA jointly developed a new space transportation system to provide commercial cargo resupply services to the International Space Station (ISS). Under the Commercial Orbital Transportation Services (COTS) program, then Orbital Sciences designed and built Antares, a medium-class launch vehicle; Cygnus, an advanced maneuvering spacecraft, and a Pressurized Cargo Module which is provided by Orbital's industrial partner Thales Alenia Space.

The Cygnus OA-7 is named the S.S. John Glenn in honor of astronaut and senator John Glenn, the first U.S. astronaut to orbit the Earth on Mercury-Atlas 6 and the oldest to go to space on STS-95, until 2021.

== History ==
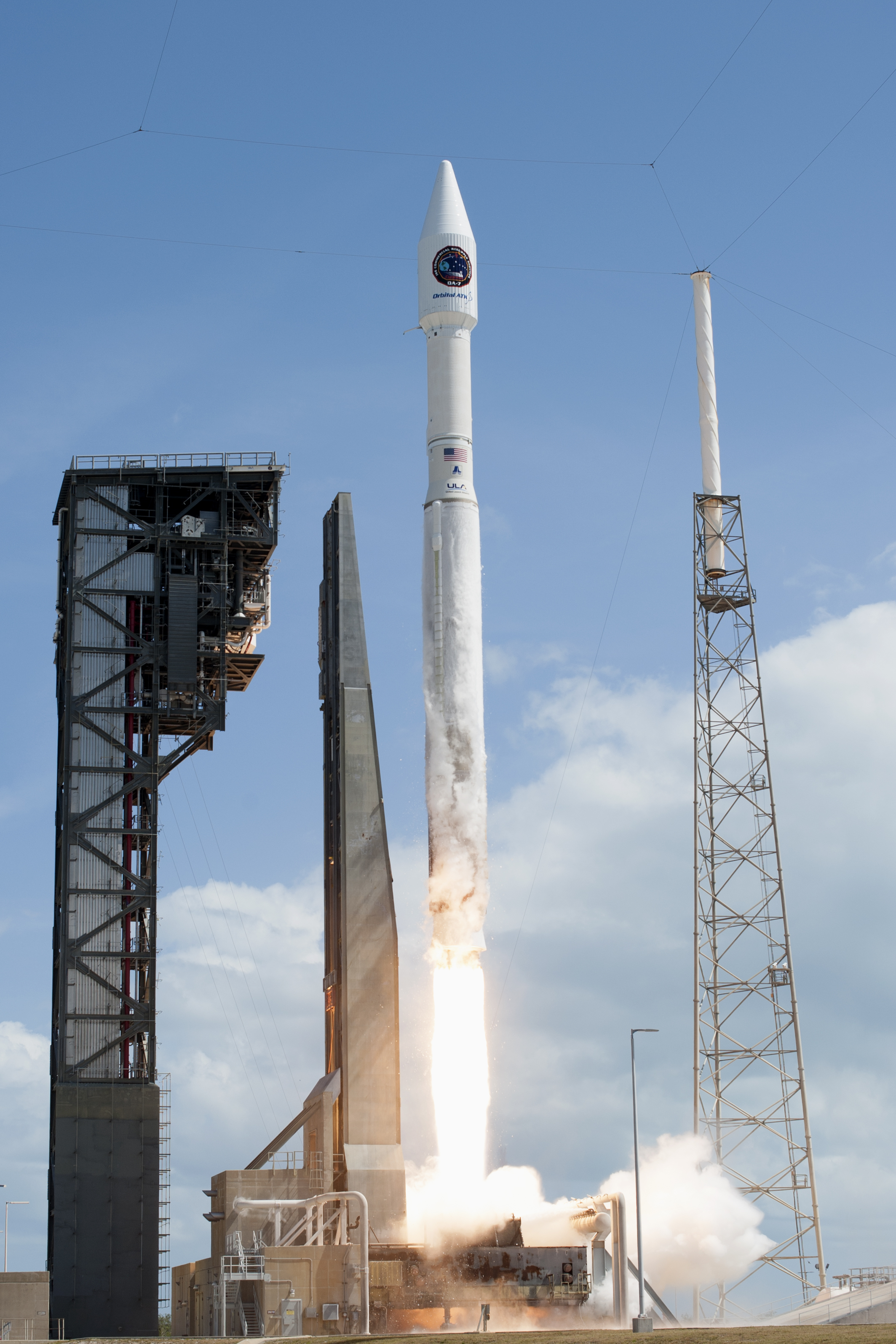
Launch of the Cygnus CRS OA-7 mission

The COTS demonstration mission was successfully conducted in September 2013, and Orbital commenced operational ISS cargo missions under the Commercial Resupply Service (CRS) program with two missions in 2014. The third operational mission, Orb CRS-3, was not successful due to an Antares failure during launch. The company decided to discontinue the Antares 100 series and accelerate the introduction of a new propulsion system. The Antares system was upgraded with newly built RD-181 first stage engines to provide greater payload performance and increased reliability.

In the meantime, the company contracted with United Launch Alliance (ULA) for two Atlas V launches from Cape Canaveral, Florida: CRS OA-4 flew in December 2015 and Cygnus OA-6 in March 2016. The first Cygnus mission on the new Antares 230 (CRS OA-5) was delayed to October 2016 and performed successfully. This particular mission, known as OA-7, enabled Orbital ATK to cover their initial CRS contracted payload obligation. At NASA's request, OA-7 was switched from an Antares to an Atlas V rocket to increase the payload delivered to the ISS. Antares flights resumed with CRS OA-8E (the first of Orbital's extended contract with NASA) in November 2017.

Production and integration of Cygnus spacecraft is performed in Dulles, Virginia. The Cygnus service module is mated with the pressurized cargo module at the launch site, and mission operations are conducted from control centers in Dulles, Virginia and Houston, Texas.

Cygnus OA-7 launched on 18 April 2017 at 15:11:26 UTC aboard an Atlas V 401 rocket. The freighter rendezvoused and was berthed to the ISS on 22 April 2017, where it remained for just under 43 days.

NASA announced on 1 June 2017 its intention to unberth Cygnus a month ahead of schedule. In preparation for unberthing, Cygnus was grappled by Canadarm2 on 2 June 2017. Early on 4 June 2017, the bolts securing Cygnus to the station were retracted, and Canadarm2 unberthed the spacecraft at 11:05 UTC. Crew members aboard the station maneuvered Cygnus to its release attitude, and at 13:10 UTC the vehicle was released from Canadarm2. One minute later, Cygnus began carrying out a series of departure burns to move it away from the ISS.

At approximately 20:00 UTC, the SAFFIRE III experiment on board Cygnus was commanded to execute. This experiment involves the controlled ignition of spacecraft material samples to test how they burn in microgravity. On 8 June 2017, four LEMUR-2 CubeSats was deployed, one pair at 20:46 UTC and the other pair at 23:46 UTC. Reentry for Cygnus is scheduled for 11 June 2017; as the vehicle begins breaking up in Earth's atmosphere, three probes will be released as part of the RED-Data2 experiment, collecting data on how high-temperature materials react to reentry, as well as helping to characterize how spacecraft break up on reentry.

Orbital ATK announced on 11 June 2017 that the OA-7 mission had formally ended at 17:08 UTC with the reentry and destruction of the S.S. John Glenn. The spacecraft reentered east of New Zealand over the Pacific Ocean, disposing of approximately 1,950 kg (4,300 lb) of trash and unneeded hardware.

== Spacecraft ==
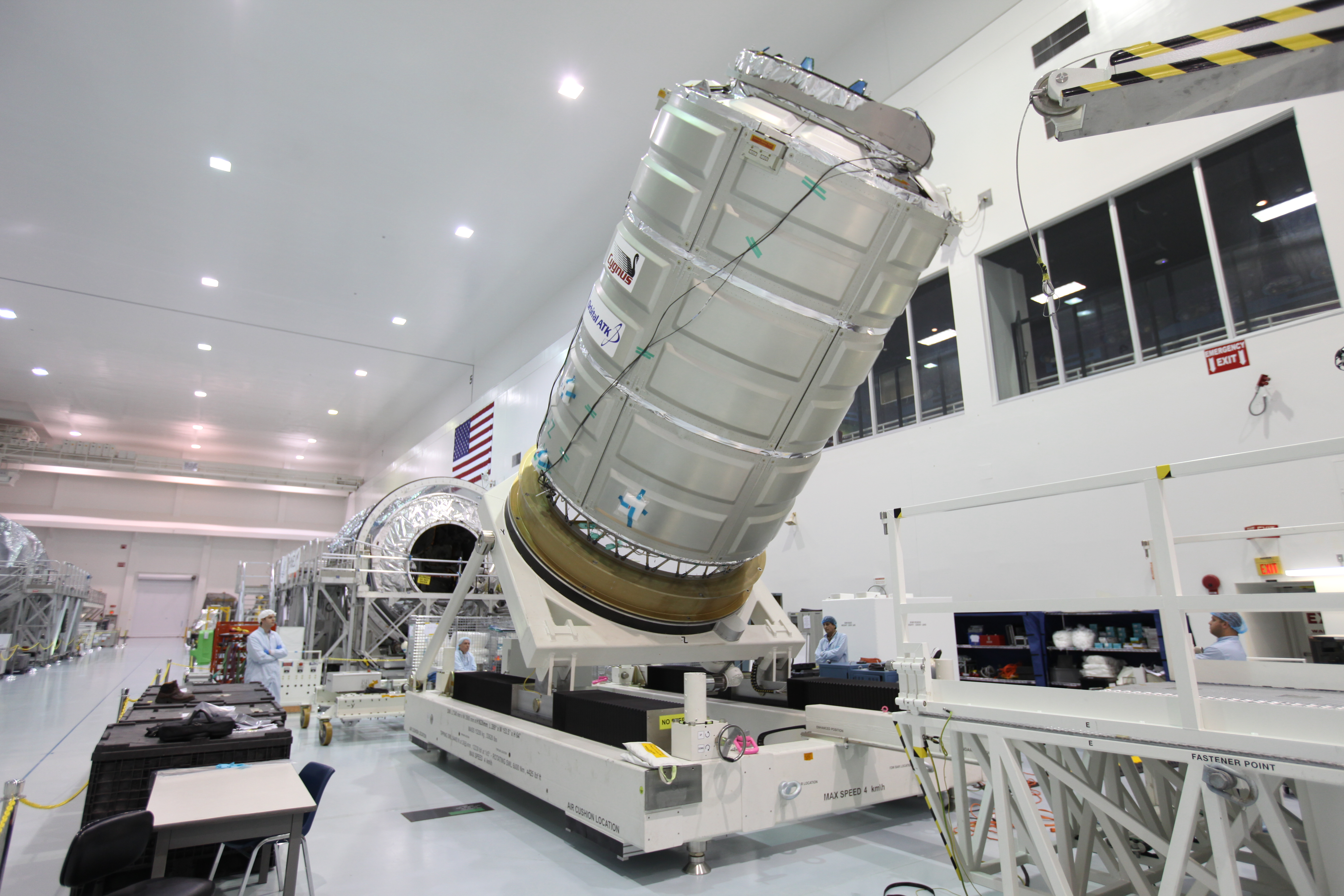
The Cygnus spacecraft inside the Space Station Processing Facility

This is the seventh of ten flights by Orbital ATK under the Commercial Resupply Services contract with NASA. This is the fourth flight of the Enhanced-sized Cygnus PCM. The spacecraft and on-board payloads were processed at Kennedy's Space Station Processing Facility.

== Manifest ==
OA-7 carried a total of 3,459 kg (7,626 lb) of material into orbit. This included 3,376 kg (7,443 lb) of pressurised cargo with packaging bound for the International Space Station, and 83 kg (183 lb) of unpressurised cargo composed of four CubeSats that will be released from the Cygnus spacecraft after unberthing from the ISS. OA-7 carried 34 other CubeSats that will be launched from the Kibō module on ISS, including 28 that were built by university students as part of the QB50 program.

== See also ==
- Uncrewed spaceflights to the International Space Station
