= Cygnus OA-8E =

Late 2017 cargo mission to the ISS

OA-8E
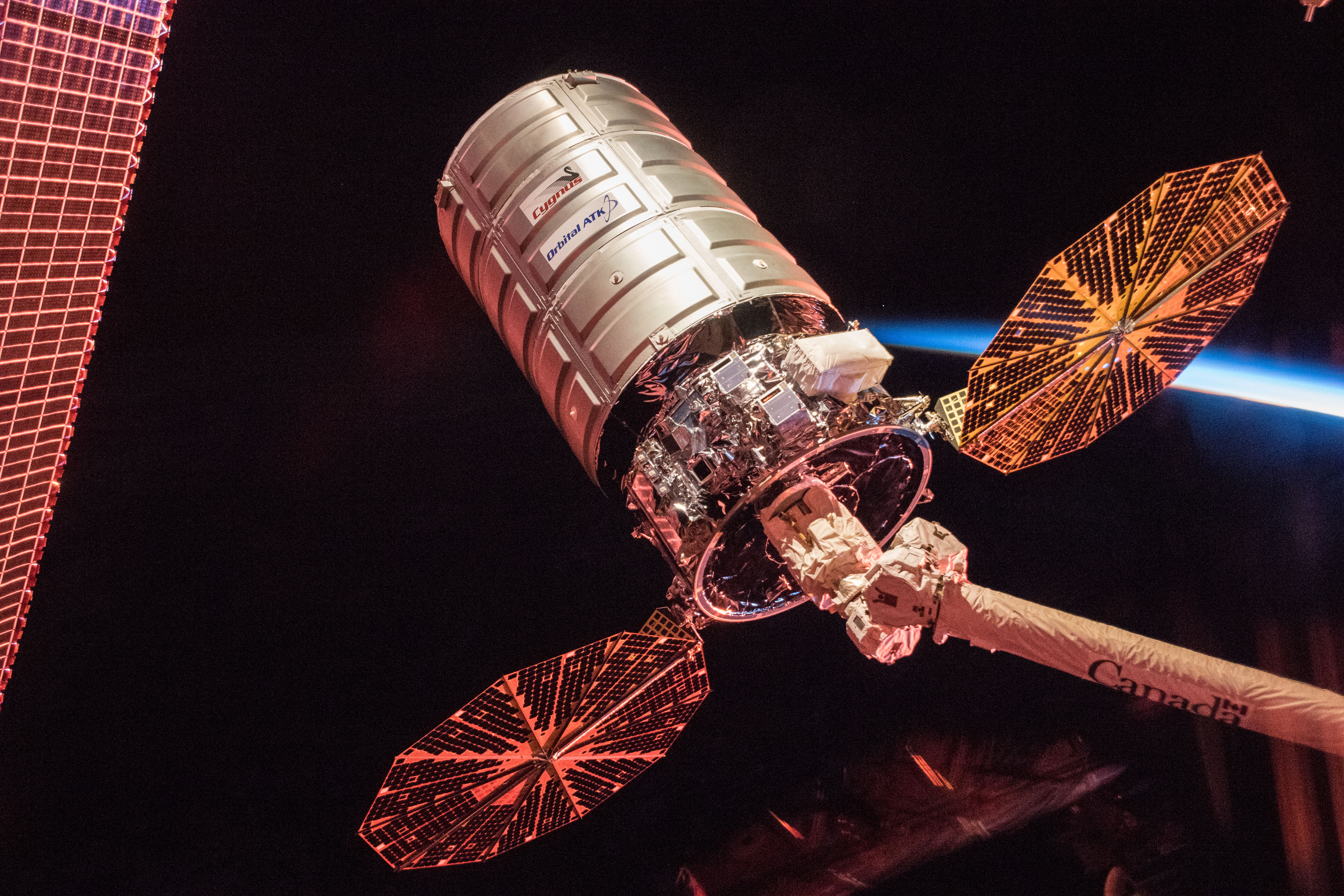
- Canadarm2 grapples the S.S. Gene Cernan
- Names: CRS OA-8E
- Mission type: ISS resupply
- Operator: Orbital ATK
- COSPAR ID: 2017-071A
- SATCAT no.: 43006
- Mission duration: 36 days, 34 minutes

Spacecraft properties
- Spacecraft: S.S. Gene Cernan
- Spacecraft type: Enhanced Cygnus
- Manufacturer: Orbital ATK; Thales Alenia Space
- Launch mass: 6,172 kg (13,607 lb)

Start of mission
- Launch date: 12 November 2017, 12:19:51 UTC (7:19:51 am EST)
- Rocket: Antares 230
- Launch site: MARS, Pad 0A

End of mission
- Disposal: Deorbited
- Decay date: 18 December 2017, 12:54 UTC

Orbital parameters
- Reference system: Geocentric orbit
- Regime: Low Earth orbit
- Inclination: 51.66°

Berthing at ISS
- Berthing port: Unity nadir
- RMS capture: 14 November 2017, 10:04 UTC
- Berthing date: 14 November 2017, 12:15 UTC
- Unberthing date: 5 December 2017, 17:52 UTC
- RMS release: 6 December 2017, 13:11 UTC
- Time berthed: 21 days, 5 hours, 37 minutes

Cargo
- Mass: 3,338 kg (7,359 lb)
- Pressurised: 3,229 kg (7,119 lb)
- Unpressurised: 109 kg (240 lb)
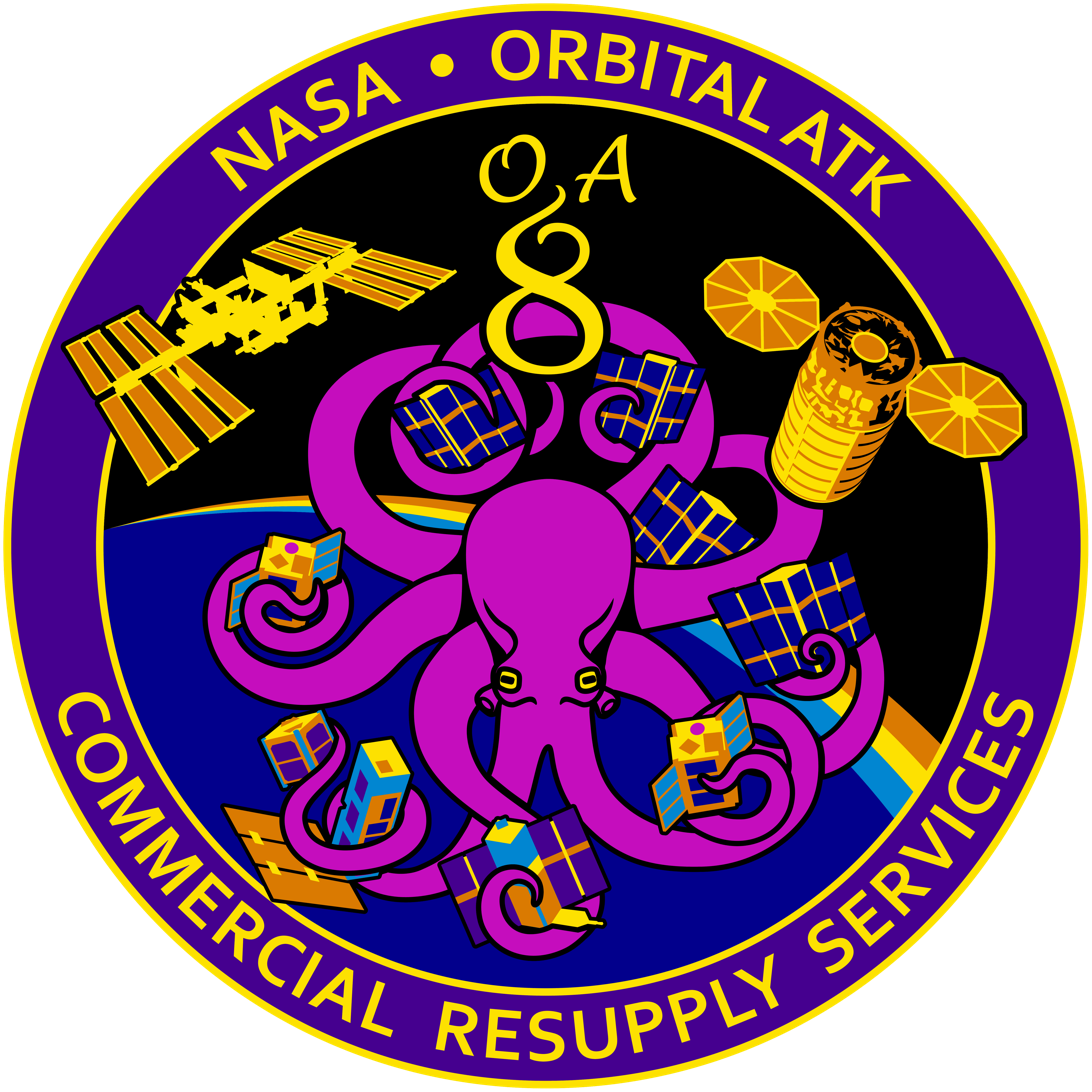
- NASA insignia Commercial Resupply Services Cygnus flights

OA-8E was the ninth flight of the Orbital ATK uncrewed resupply spacecraft Cygnus and its eighth flight to the International Space Station (ISS) under the Commercial Resupply Services (CRS-1) contract with NASA. The mission launched on 12 November 2017 at 12:19:51 UTC. Orbital and NASA jointly developed a new space transportation system to provide commercial cargo resupply services to the International Space Station (ISS). Under the Commercial Orbital Transportation System (COTS) program, then Orbital Sciences designed and built Antares, a medium-class launch vehicle; Cygnus, an advanced maneuvering spacecraft, and a Pressurized Cargo Module which is provided by Orbital's industrial partner Thales Alenia Space.

== History ==
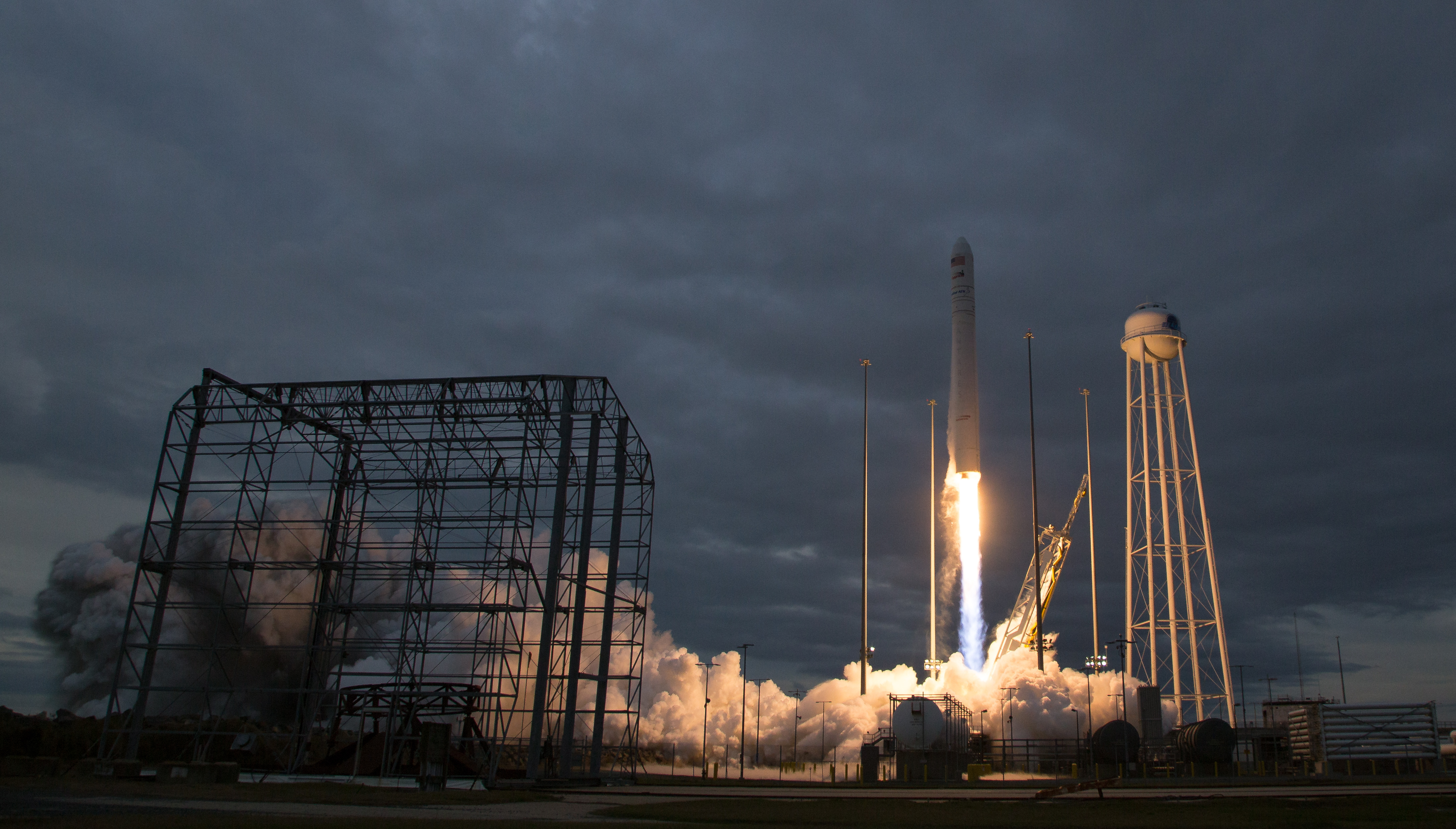
Launch of Cygnus CRS OA-8E on 12 November 2017

The COTS demonstration mission was successfully conducted in September 2013, and Orbital commenced operational ISS cargo missions under the Commercial Resupply Service (CRS) program with two missions in 2014. Regrettably, the third operational mission, CRS Orb-3, was not successful due to spectacular Antares failure during launch. The company decided to discontinue the Antares 100 series and accelerate the introduction of a new propulsion system. The Antares system has been upgraded with newly built RD-181 first-stage engines to provide greater payload performance and increased reliability.

In the meantime, the company had contracted with United Launch Alliance for an Atlas V launch of CRS OA-4 in late 2015 from Cape Canaveral, Florida and with a second Atlas V Cygnus launch in 2016. The company had planned Cygnus missions for the first (CRS OA-5), second (CRS OA-6) and fourth quarters (Cygnus OA-7) of 2016. Two of these flew on the new Antares 230 and one on the aforementioned second Atlas V. These three missions enabled Orbital ATK to cover their initial CRS contracted payload obligation. This particular mission, is known as OA-8E, is part of an extension program that will enable NASA to cover the ISS resupply needs until the Commercial Resupply Services-2 (CRS-2) contract enters in effect. It is called OA-8E rather than OA-8, because the switch to a mix of Atlas V and the more powerful Antares 230 enabled the company to cover its original contract with just 7 flights, even counting the Orb-3 failure, and thus the E indicates that it actually is an extension above the originally contracted payload transport.

Production and integration of Cygnus spacecraft is performed in Dulles, Virginia. The Cygnus service module is mated with the pressurized cargo module at the launch site, and mission operations are conducted from control centers in Dulles, Virginia and Houston, Texas.

The launch was previously scheduled for 10 November 2017 at 13:03 UTC before being moved to 11 November 2017 at 12:37:24 UTC. The 11 November 2017 launch attempt resulted in a twenty-four hour recycle due to a plane flying into the restricted area with less than a minute into the count. The Antares rocket launched the 8th Cygnus cargo vehicle on Sunday 12 November 2017 at 12:19:51 UTC.

== Spacecraft ==
This was the eighth of ten flights by Orbital ATK under the Commercial Resupply Services contract with NASA, and is considered an extension over the originally contracted flights. This was the fifth flight of the enhanced-sized Cygnus PCM.

In an Orbital ATK tradition, this Cygnus spacecraft was named the S.S. Gene Cernan after one of NASA's Apollo astronauts, Apollo 17 commander Eugene Cernan (1934-2017), the last man (as of 2020) to walk on the Moon and one of only three humans to visit the Moon (in orbit or on the surface) twice.

== Manifest ==
Total cargo mass: 3,338 kg (7,359 lb)

- Pressured cargo with packaging: 3,229 kg (7,119 lb)
  - Crew supplies: 1,240 kg (2,730 lb)
  - Science investigations: 740 kg (1,630 lb)
  - Spacewalk equipment: 132 kg (291 lb)
  - Vehicle hardware: 851 kg (1,876 lb)
  - Computer resources: 34 kg (75 lb)
- Unpressurized cargo: 109 kg (240 lb)

== See also ==
- Uncrewed spaceflights to the International Space Station
