= OA-4 =

OA-4 may refer to:

- Douglas OA-4 Dolphin
- Douglas OA-4 Skyhawk, a variant of the Douglas A-4 Skyhawk
- Cygnus CRS OA-4, the Orbital Sciences CRS-4 mission
