= Antares (rocket) =

Medium-lift expendable rocket by Northrop Grumman

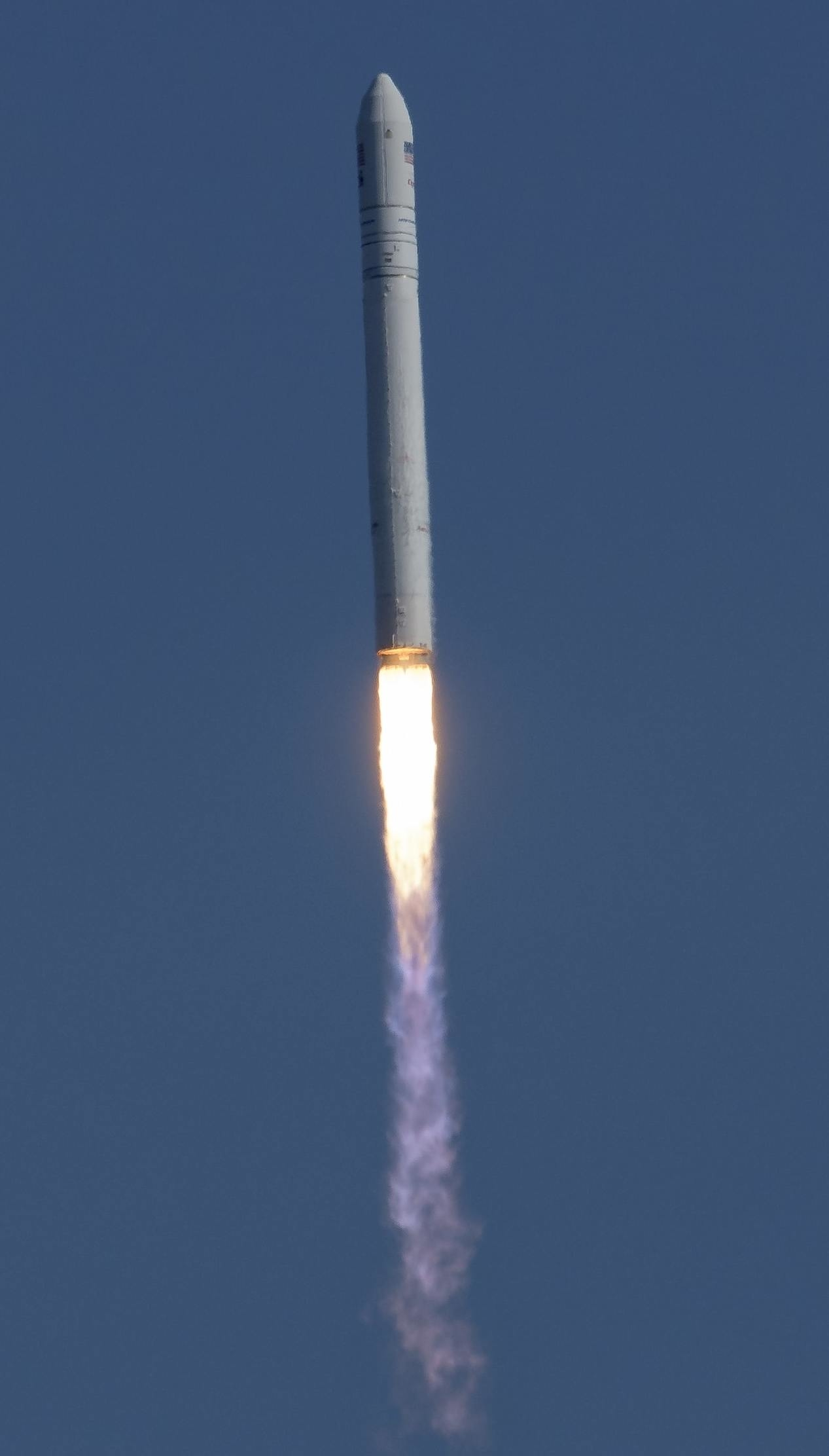
- Launch of an Antares 230
- Function: Medium-lift launch vehicle
- Manufacturer: Orbital Sciences (2013–2015); Orbital ATK (2015–2018); Northrop Grumman (2018–present)
- Country of origin: United States
- Project cost: US$472 million until 2012
- Cost per launch: US$80−85 million

Size
- Height: 110/120: 40.5 m (133 ft); 130: 41.9 m (137 ft); 230/230+: 42.5 m (139 ft)
- Diameter: 3.9 m (13 ft)
- Mass: 100 series: 282,000–296,000 kg (622,000–653,000 lb); 200 series: 298,000 kg (657,000 lb)
- Stages: 2 to 3

Capacity

Payload to LEO
- Mass: 8,000 kg (18,000 lb)

Associated rockets
- Comparable: Delta II, Atlas III, Atlas V, Falcon 9

Launch history
- Status: 110: Retired; 120: Retired; 130: Retired; 230: Retired; 230+: Retired; 300: In development
- Launch sites: MARS, LP-0A
- Total launches: 18 (110: 2, 120: 2, 130: 1, 230: 5, 230+: 8)
- Success(es): 17 (110: 2, 120: 2, 130: 0, 230: 5, 230+: 8)
- Failure: 1 (130)
- First flight: 110: April 21, 2013; 120: January 9, 2014; 130: October 28, 2014; 230: October 17, 2016; 230+: November 2, 2019; 300: 2026 (planned)
- Last flight: 110: September 18, 2013; 120: July 13, 2014; 130: October 28, 2014; 230: April 17, 2019; 230+: August 2, 2023
- Carries passengers or cargo: Cygnus

First stage (Antares 100)
- Empty mass: 18,700 kg (41,200 lb)
- Gross mass: 260,700 kg (574,700 lb)
- Powered by: 2 × NK-33 (AJ26-62)
- Maximum thrust: 3,265 kN (734,000 lb_{f})
- Specific impulse: SL: 297 s (2.91 km/s) vac: 331 s (3.25 km/s)
- Burn time: 235 seconds
- Propellant: RP-1 / LOX

First stage (Antares 200)
- Empty mass: 20,600 kg (45,400 lb)
- Gross mass: 262,600 kg (578,900 lb)
- Powered by: 2 × RD-181
- Maximum thrust: 3,844 kN (864,000 lb_{f})
- Specific impulse: SL: 311.9 s (3.06 km/s) vac: 339.2 s (3.33 km/s)
- Burn time: 215 seconds
- Propellant: RP-1 / LOX

First stage (Antares 300)
- Powered by: 7 × Miranda
- Propellant: RP-1 / LOX

Second stage – Castor 30A/B/XL
- Gross mass: A: 14,035 kg (30,942 lb); B: 13,970 kg (30,800 lb); XL: 26,300 kg (58,000 lb)
- Propellant mass: A: 12,815 kg (28,252 lb); B: 12,887 kg (28,411 lb); XL: 24,200 kg (53,400 lb)
- Maximum thrust: A: 259 kN (58,200 lb_{f}); B: 293.4 kN (65,960 lb_{f}); XL: 474 kN (107,000 lb_{f})
- Burn time: A: 136 seconds; B: 127 seconds; XL: 156 seconds
- Propellant: TP-H8299 / Al / AP

Antares (/ænˈtɑːriːz/), known during early development as Taurus II, is an American expendable medium-lift launch vehicle developed by Orbital Sciences Corporation with financial support from NASA under the Commercial Orbital Transportation Services (COTS) program awarded in February 2008. It was developed alongside Orbital's automated cargo spacecraft, Cygnus, which also received COTS funding. Like other Orbital launch vehicles, Antares leveraged lower-cost, off-the-shelf parts and designs. Since 2018, the rocket has been manufactured by Northrop Grumman.

The first stage is liquid fueled, burning RP-1 (kerosene) and liquid oxygen (LOX). As Orbital had limited experience with large liquid stages, construction was subcontracted for all versions of Antares. The 100 and 200 series were built by the Ukrainian companies Pivdenne and Pivdenmash, using refurbished NK-33 engines from the Soviet N1 program on the 100 series and newly built Russian RD-181 engines on the 200 series after the loss of an Antares 130 vehicle in 2014. After Russia's 2022 invasion of Ukraine ended access to these suppliers, Northrop Grumman announced the 300 series, with a first stage developed by Firefly Aerospace based on the company's MLV rocket using composite structures and seven Miranda engines to increase payload capacity.

The second stage is a solid-fuel motor from the Castor 30 family, derived from the Castor 120 used on the Minotaur-C (the original Taurus I) and ultimately from the Peacekeeper ICBM first stage. While an optional third stage is offered, it has never been used, as the Cygnus spacecraft incorporates its own service module for orbital maneuvers.

Antares made its first flight on April 21, 2013, launching the Antares A-ONE mission from Launch Pad 0A at the Mid-Atlantic Regional Spaceport (MARS) with a Cygnus mass simulator. On September 18, 2013, it successfully launched Orb-D1, the first Cygnus mission to rendezvous with the International Space Station (ISS). After completing the two COTS demonstration flights, Antares and Cygnus were awarded two Commercial Resupply Services contracts covering 25 ISS cargo missions.

The COTS program also supported the development of SpaceX's Dragon spacecraft and Falcon 9 rocket, intended to foster a competitive commercial spaceflight industry. Unlike Falcon 9, which has secured a broad commercial launch market, Antares has been used exclusively for NASA cargo missions, with Cygnus as its sole payload.

== History ==
As the Space Shuttle program neared its end, NASA sought to develop new capabilities for resupplying the International Space Station (ISS). Departing from the traditional model of government-owned and operated spacecraft, the agency proposed a new approach: commercial companies would operate spacecraft, while NASA would act as a customer.

To encourage innovation, NASA offered funding through the Commercial Orbital Transportation Services (COTS) program to support the development of new spacecraft and launch vehicles. On February 19, 2008, NASA announced that it would award Orbital Sciences Corporation a COTS contract worth $171 million. Orbital was expected to invest an additional $150 million, divided between $130 million for the rocket booster and $20 million for the spacecraft.

As part of the COTS program, Orbital would be expected to conduct a successful demonstration of its rocket booster and spacecraft. If both demonstration flights were successful, Orbital would be eligible for a lucrative Commercial Resupply Service contract of $1.9 billion for eight flights to the ISS.

In June 2008, it was announced that the Mid-Atlantic Regional Spaceport, formerly part of the Wallops Flight Facility, in Virginia, would be the primary launch site for the rocket. Launch pad 0A (LP-0A), previously used for the failed Conestoga rocket, would be modified to handle Antares. Wallops allows launches which reach the International Space Station's orbit as effectively as those from Cape Canaveral, Florida, while being less crowded. The first Antares flight launched a Cygnus mass simulator.

On December 10, 2009, Alliant Techsystems Inc. (ATK) test-fired their Castor 30 motor for use on the second stage of the Antares rocket. In March 2010, Orbital Sciences and Aerojet completed test firings of the AJ-26 engines.

Originally designated the Taurus II, Orbital Sciences renamed the vehicle Antares, after the star of the same name, on December 12, 2011.

As of April 2012, development costs were estimated at $472 million.

On February 22, 2013, a hot fire test was successfully performed, the entire first stage being erected on the pad and held down while the engines fired for 29 seconds.

== Design ==
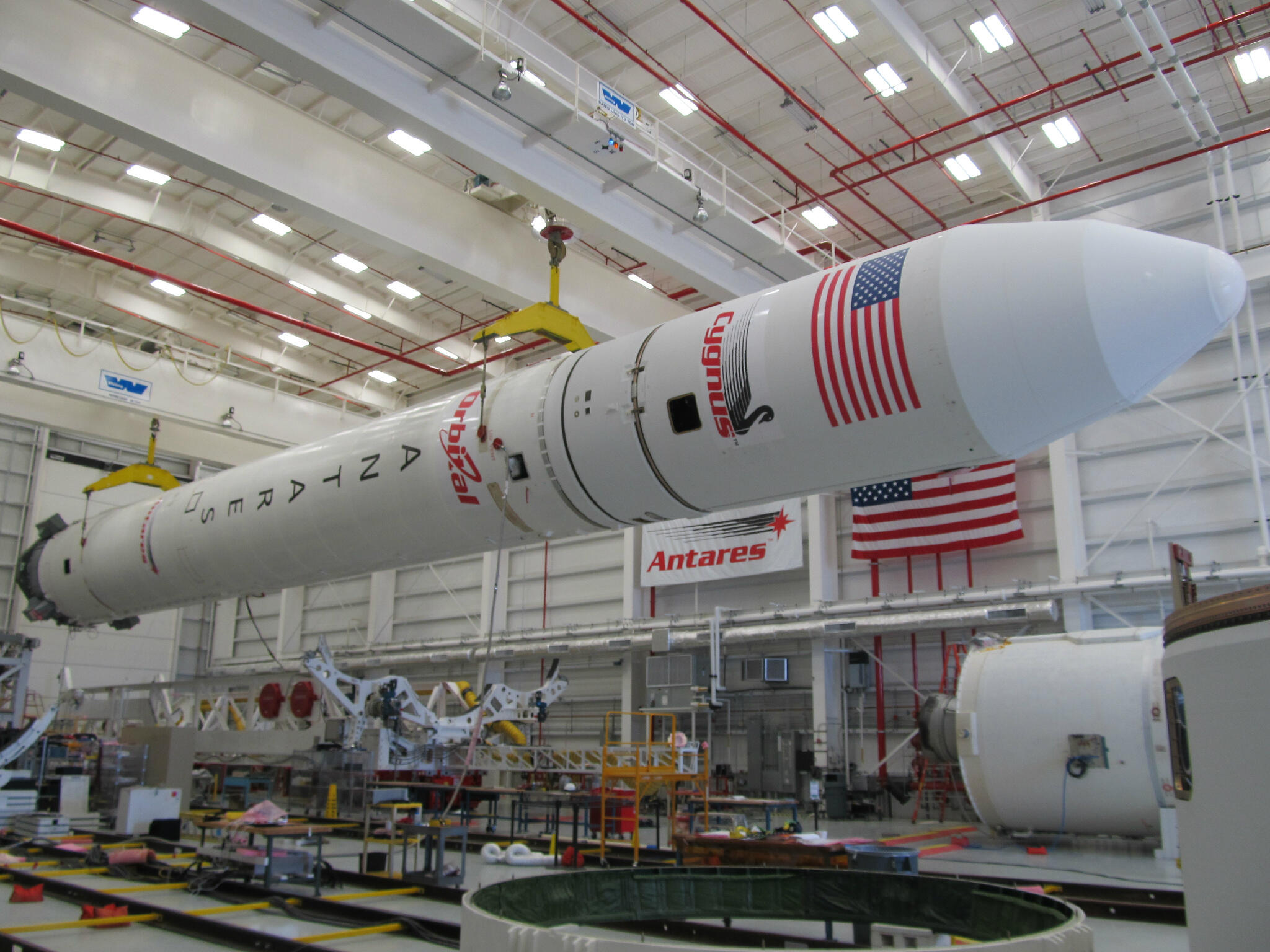
An assembled Antares rocket in the Horizontal Integration Facility.

=== First stage ===
The first stage of Antares burns RP-1 (kerosene) and liquid oxygen (LOX). As Orbital had little experience with large liquid stages and LOX propellant, the first stage core was designed and is manufactured in Ukraine by Pivdenne Design Office and Pivdenmash and includes propellant tanks, pressurization tanks, valves, sensors, feed lines, tubing, wiring and other associated hardware. Like the Zenit—also manufactured by Pivdenmash—the Antares vehicle has a diameter of 3.9 m (150 in) with a matching 3.9 m payload fairing.

==== Antares 100 series ====
The Antares 100-series first stage was powered by two Aerojet AJ26 engines. These began as Kuznetsov NK-33 engines built in the Soviet Union in the late 1960s and early 1970s, 43 of which were purchased by Aerojet in the 1990s. Twenty of these were refurbished into AJ26 engines for Antares. Modifications included equipping the engines for gimballing, adding US electronics, and qualifying the engines to fire for twice as long as designed and to operate at 108% of their original thrust. Together they produced 3,265 kilonewtons (734,000 lb_{f}) of thrust at sea level and 3,630 kN (816,100 lb_{f}) in vacuum.

Following the catastrophic failure of an AJ26 during testing at Stennis Space Center in May 2014 and the Orb-3 launch failure in October 2014, likely caused by an engine turbopump, the Antares 100-series was retired.

==== Antares 200 series ====
Because of concerns over corrosion, aging, and the limited supply of AJ26 engines, Orbital had selected new first stage engines to bid on a second major long-term contract for cargo resupply of the ISS. After the loss of the Antares rocket in October 2014, Orbital Sciences announced that the Russian RD-181—a modified version of the RD-191—would replace the AJ-26 on the Antares 200-series. The first flight of the Antares 230 configuration using the RD-181 launched on October 17, 2016, carrying the Cygnus OA-5 cargo to the ISS.

The Antares 200 and 200+ first stages are powered by two RD-181 engines, which provide 440 kilonewtons (100,000 lbf) more thrust than the dual AJ26 engines used on the Antares 100. Orbital adapted the existing core stage to accommodate the increased performance in the 200 Series, allowing Antares to deliver up to 6,500 kg (14,300 lb) to low Earth orbit. The surplus performance of the Antares 200-series will allow Orbital to fulfill its ISS resupply contract in only four additional flights, rather than the five that would have been required with the Antares 100-series.

While the 200 series adapted the originally ordered 100 Series stages (KB Pivdenne/Pivdenmash, Zenit derived), it requires under-throttling the RD-181 engines, which reduces performance.

The Antares was upgraded to the Antares 230+ for the NASA Commercial Resupply Services 2 contract. NG-12, launched November 2, 2019, was the first NASA CRS-2 mission to ISS using the 230+ upgrades. The most significant upgrades were structural changes to the intertank bay (between the LOX and RP-1 tanks) and the forward bay (forward of the LOX). Additionally, the company is working on trajectory improvements via a "load-release autopilot" that will provide greater mass to orbit capability.

==== Antares 300 series ====
In August 2022, Northrop Grumman announced that it had contracted Firefly Aerospace to build the 300-series first stage. They will also be collaborating on the in-development Eclipse launch vehicle. Eclipse and the Antares 300-series will use the same composite structures, and seven Miranda engines. The 7,200 kN (1,600,000 lbf) of thrust they provide will be substantially greater than that of the previous 200-series first stage. Northrop Grumman indicated the new first stage will substantially increase the mass capability of Antares.

The announcement occurred as a result of the 2022 Russian invasion of Ukraine, which jeopardized supply chains for the previous first stages, which had been manufactured in Ukraine and used RD-181 engines from Russia.

=== Second stage ===
The second stage is an Orbital ATK Castor 30-series solid-fuel rocket, developed as a derivative of the Castor 120 solid motor used as Minotaur-C's first stage, itself based on a LGM-118 Peacekeeper ICBM first stage. The first two flights of Antares used a Castor 30A, which was replaced by the enhanced Castor 30B for subsequent flights. The Castor 30B produces 293.4 kN (65,960 lb_{f}) average and 395.7 kN (88,960 lb_{f}) maximum thrust, and uses electromechanical thrust vector control. For increased performance, the larger Castor 30XL is available and will be used on ISS resupply flights to allow Antares to carry the Enhanced Cygnus.

The Castor 30XL upper stage for Antares 230+ is being optimized for the CRS-2 contract. The initial design of the Castor 30XL was conservatively built, and after gaining flight experience it was determined that the structural component of the motor case could be lightened.

=== Third stage ===
Antares offers three optional third stages: the Bi-Propellant Third Stage (BTS), a Star 48-based third stage and an Orion 38 motor. BTS is derived from Orbital's GEOStar, a spacecraft bus and uses nitrogen tetroxide and hydrazine for propellant; it is intended to precisely place payloads into their final orbits. The Star 48-based stage uses a Star 48BV solid rocket motor and would be used for higher energy orbits. The Orion 38 is used on the Minotaur and Pegasus rockets as an upper stage.

=== Fairing ===
The 3.9-meter (13 ft) diameter, 9.9-meter (32 ft) high fairing is manufactured by Northrop Grumman of Iuka, Mississippi, which also builds other composite structures for the vehicle, including the combined fairing adapter, dodecagon, motor cone, and interstage.

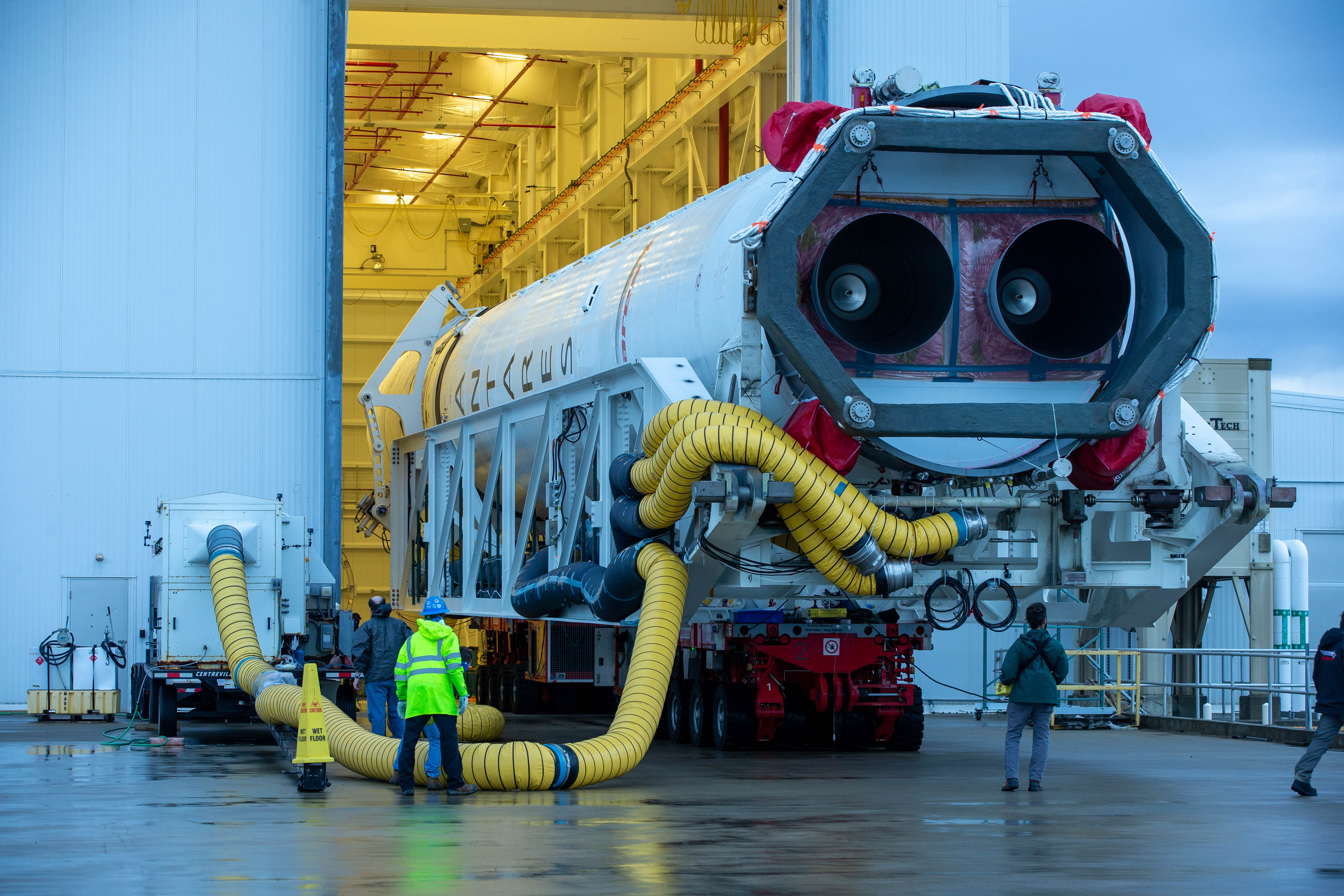
Rear view of Antares

=== NASA Commercial Resupply Services-2 : Enhancements ===
On January 14, 2016, NASA awarded three cargo contracts via CRS-2. Orbital ATK's Cygnus was one of these contracts.

According to Mark Pieczynski, Orbital ATK Vice President, Flight Systems Group, "A further improved version [of Antares for CRS-2 contract] is in development which will include: Stage 1 core updates including structural reinforcements and optimization to accommodate increased loads. (Also) certain refinements to the RD-181 engines and CASTOR 30XL motor; and Payload accommodations improvements including a 'pop-top' feature incorporated in the fairing to allow late Cygnus cargo load and optimized fairing adapter structure".

Previously, it was understood that these planned upgrades from the Antares 230 series would create a vehicle known as the Antares 300 series. However, when asked specifically about Antares 300 series development, Mr. Pieczynski stated that Orbital ATK has "not determined to call the upgrades, we are working on, a 300 series. This is still TBD".

In May 2018 the Antares program manager Kurt Eberly indicated that the upgrades will be referred to as Antares 230+.

Use of Antares 330 for future CRS flights was confirmed in reporting from Breaking Defense in June 2024. The 330 will used the same second stage, fairing, avionics and software as prior versions.

== Configurations and numbering ==
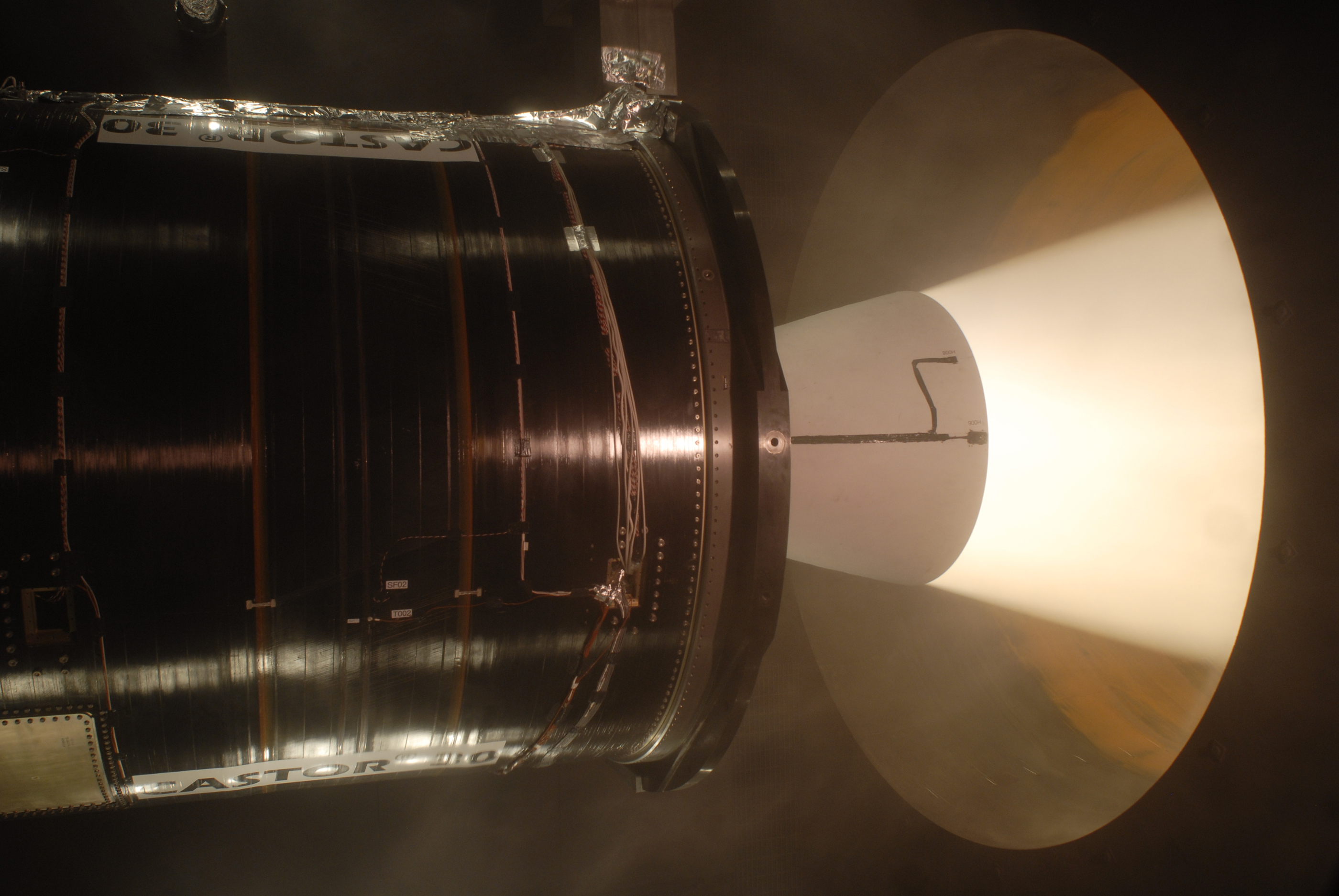
Test firing of Castor 30 second stage

The first two test flights used a Castor 30A second stage. All subsequent flights will use either a Castor 30B or Castor 30XL. The rocket's configuration is indicated by a three-digit number, the first number representing the first stage, the second the type of second stage, and the third the type of third stage. A + sign added as suffix (fourth position) signifies performance upgrades to the Antares 230 variant.

Number	First digit	Second digit	Third digit
Number	(First stage)	(Second stage)	(Third stage)
0	—N/a	—N/a	No third stage
1	2 × AJ26-62	Castor 30A	BTS (3 × BT-4)
2	2 × RD-181	Castor 30B	Star 48BV
3	7 × Miranda	Castor 30XL	Orion 38

== Notable missions and anomalies ==
=== Antares A-ONE ===
Originally scheduled for 2012, the first Antares launch, designated A-ONE was conducted on April 21, 2013, carrying the Cygnus Mass Simulator (a boilerplate Cygnus spacecraft) and four CubeSats contracted by Spaceflight Incorporated: Dove 1 for Cosmogia Incorporated (now Planet Labs) and three PhoneSat satellites—Alexander, Graham and Bell for NASA.

Prior to the launch, a 27-second test firing of the rocket's AJ26 engines was conducted successfully on February 22, 2013, following an attempt on February 13 which was abandoned before ignition.

A-ONE used the Antares 110 configuration, with a Castor 30A second stage and no third stage. The launch took place from Pad 0A of the Mid-Atlantic Regional Spaceport on Wallops Island, Virginia. LP-0A was a former Conestoga launch complex which had only been used once before, in 1995, for the Conestoga's only orbital launch attempt. Antares became the largest—and first—liquid-fuelled rocket to fly from Wallops Island, as well as the largest rocket launched by Orbital Sciences.

The first attempt to launch the rocket, on April 17, 2013, was scrubbed after an umbilical detached from the rocket's second stage, and a second attempt on April 20 was scrubbed due to high altitude winds. At the third attempt on April 21, the rocket lifted off at the beginning of its launch window. The launch window for all three attempts was three hours beginning at 21:00 UTC (17:00 EDT), shortening to two hours at the start of the terminal count, and ten minutes later in the count.

=== Cygnus CRS Orb-3 ===
Video of Cygnus CRS Orb-3 failed launch

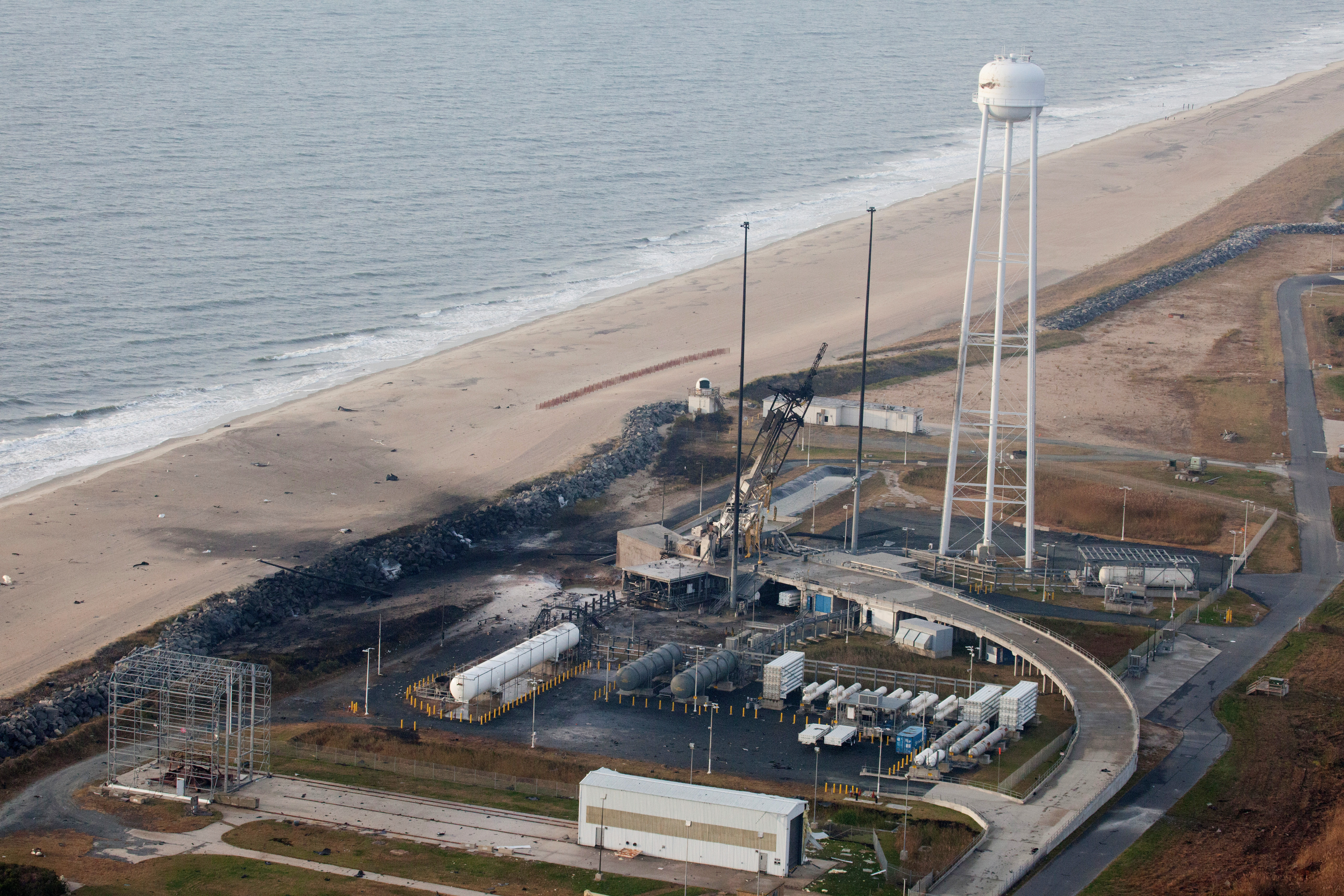
Pad 0A after the incident

On October 28, 2014, the attempted launch of an Antares carrying a Cygnus cargo spacecraft on the Orb-3 resupply mission failed catastrophically six seconds after liftoff from Mid-Atlantic Regional Spaceport at Wallops Flight Facility, Virginia. An explosion occurred in the thrust section just as the vehicle cleared the tower, and it fell back down onto the launch pad. The range safety officer sent the destruct command just before impact. There were no injuries. Orbital Sciences reported that Launch Pad 0A "escaped significant damage", though initial estimates for repairs were in the $20 million range. Orbital Sciences formed an anomaly investigation board to investigate the cause of the incident. They traced it to a failure of the first stage LOX turbopump, but could not find a specific cause. However, the refurbished NK-33 engines, originally manufactured over 40 years earlier and stored for decades, were suspected as having leaks, corrosion, or manufacturing defects that had not been detected. The NASA Accident Investigation Report was more direct in its failure assessment. On October 6, 2015, almost one year after the accident, Pad 0A was restored to use. Total repair costs were about $15 million.

Following the failure, Orbital sought to purchase launch services for its Cygnus spacecraft in order to satisfy its cargo contract with NASA, and on December 9, 2014, Orbital announced that at least one, and possibly two, Cygnus flights would be launched on Atlas V rockets from Cape Canaveral Air Force Station. As it happened, Cygnus OA-4 and Cygnus OA-6 were launched with an Atlas V and the Antares 230 performed its maiden flight with Cygnus OA-5 in October 2016. One further mission was launched aboard an Atlas in April 2017 (Cygnus OA-7), fulfilling Orbital's contractual obligations towards NASA. It was followed by the Antares 230 in regular service with Cygnus OA-8E in November 2017, with three further missions scheduled on their extended contract.

== Launch statistics ==
=== Rocket configurations ===
- Antares 110
- Antares 120
- Antares 130
- Antares 230
- Antares 230+

=== Launch outcomes ===
- Failure
- Partial failure
- Success
- Scheduled

=== Operator ===
- Orbital Sciences
- Orbital ATK
- Northrop Grumman

== Past launches ==
Flight No.	Date / time (UTC)	Rocket variant	Launch site	Payload, Spacecraft name	Payload mass	Orbit	Operator	Customer	Launch outcome
1	April 21, 2013; 21:00	Antares 110	MARS, LP-0A	Cygnus Mass Simulator; Dove 1; Alexander; Graham; Bell	—N/a	LEO	Orbital Sciences Corporation	NASA (COTS)	Success
1	Antares A-ONE, Antares test flight, using a Castor 30A second stage and no third stage.								
2	September 18, 2013; 14:58	Antares 110	MARS, LP-0A	Cygnus (standard); Orb-D1; G. David Low	700 kg (1,543 lb)	LEO (ISS)	Orbital Sciences Corporation	NASA (COTS)	Success
2	Orbital Sciences COTS demonstration flight. First Antares mission with a real Cygnus capsule, first mission to rendezvous and berth with the International Space Station, second launch of Antares. The rendezvous maneuver was delayed due to a computer data link problem, but the issue was resolved and berthing followed shortly thereafter.								
3	January 9, 2014; 18:07	Antares 120	MARS, LP-0A	Cygnus (standard); CRS Orb-1; C. Gordon Fullerton	1,260 kg (2,780 lb)	LEO (ISS)	Orbital Sciences Corporation	NASA (CRS)	Success
3	First Commercial Resupply Service (CRS) mission for Cygnus, and first Antares launch using the Castor 30B upper stage.								
4	July 13, 2014; 16:52	Antares 120	MARS, LP-0A	Cygnus (standard); CRS Orb-2; Janice Voss	1,494 kg (3,293 lb)	LEO (ISS)	Orbital Sciences Corporation	NASA (CRS)	Success
4	Spacecraft carried supplies for the ISS, including research equipment, crew provisions, hardware, and science experiments.								
5	October 28, 2014; 22:22	Antares 130	MARS, LP-0A	Cygnus (standard); CRS Orb-3; Deke Slayton	2,215 kg (4,883 lb)	LEO (ISS)	Orbital Sciences Corporation	NASA (CRS)	Failure
5	LOX turbopump failure T+6 seconds. Rocket fell back onto the pad and exploded. First Antares launch to use Castor 30XL upper stage. In addition to ISS supplies, payload included a Planetary Resources Arkyd-3 satellite and a NASA JPL/UT Austin CubeSat mission named RACE.								
6	October 17, 2016; 23:45	Antares 230	MARS, LP-0A	Cygnus (enhanced); CRS OA-5; Alan G. Poindexter	2,425 kg (5,346 lb)	LEO (ISS)	Orbital ATK	NASA (CRS)	Success
6	First launch of Enhanced Cygnus on Orbital's new Antares 230.								
7	November 12, 2017; 12:19	Antares 230	MARS, LP-0A	Cygnus (enhanced); CRS OA-8E; Gene Cernan	3,338 kg (7,359 lb)	LEO (ISS)	Orbital ATK	NASA (CRS)	Success
8	May 21, 2018; 08:44	Antares 230	MARS, LP-0A	Cygnus (enhanced); CRS OA-9E; J.R. Thompson	3,350 kg (7,386 lb)	LEO (ISS)	Orbital ATK	NASA (CRS)	Success
8	Spacecraft carried ISS hardware, crew supplies, and scientific payloads, including the Cold Atom Lab and the Biomolecule Extraction and Sequencing Technology experiment. The Cygnus also demonstrated boosting the station's orbital velocity for the first time, by 0.06 meter per second.								
9	November 17, 2018; 09:01	Antares 230	MARS, LP-0A	Cygnus (enhanced); CRS NG-10; John Young	3,416 kg (7,531 lb)	LEO (ISS)	Northrop Grumman	NASA (CRS)	Success
9	Largest number of satellites launched on a single rocket (108). Cygnus NG-10, CHEFsat 2, Kicksat 2, 104 Sprite Chipsats (deployed from Kicksat 2), MYSAT 1.								
10	April 17, 2019; 20:46	Antares 230	MARS, LP-0A	Cygnus (enhanced); CRS NG-11; Roger Chaffee	3,447 kg (7,600 lbs)	LEO (ISS)	Northrop Grumman	NASA (CRS)	Success
10	Launched the last mission under the Commercial Resupply Services-1 for Cygnus.								
11	November 2, 2019; 13:59	Antares 230+	MARS, LP-0A	Cygnus (enhanced); CRS NG-12; Alan Bean	3,728 kg (8,221 lbs)	LEO (ISS)	Northrop Grumman	NASA (CRS)	Success
11	Cygnus NG-12 is the first mission under the NASA Commercial Resupply Services-2 contract. NG-12 is also the first to use upgraded launcher, Antares 230+.								
12	February 15, 2020; 20:21	Antares 230+	MARS, LP-0A	Cygnus (enhanced); CRS NG-13; Robert Lawrence, Jr.	3,377 kg (7,445 lbs)	LEO (ISS)	Northrop Grumman	NASA (CRS)	Success
13	October 3, 2020; 01:16	Antares 230+	MARS, LP-0A	Cygnus (enhanced); CRS NG-14; Kalpana Chawla	3,458 kg (7,624 lbs)	LEO (ISS)	Northrop Grumman	NASA (CRS)	Success
13	Spacecraft carried ISS hardware, crew supplies, and scientific payloads, including a new toilet (Universal Waste Management System, UWMS), Ammonia Electrooxidation, radishes for Plant Habitat-02, drugs for targeted cancer treatments with Onco-Selectors, and a customized 360-degree camera to capture future spacewalks.								
14	February 20, 2021; 17:36	Antares 230+	MARS, LP-0A	Cygnus (enhanced); CRS NG-15; Katherine Johnson	3,810 kg (8399 lbs)	LEO (ISS)	Northrop Grumman	NASA (CRS)	Success
14	This mission carried over 8,000 pounds of cargo including roundworms to study muscle loss and the Spaceborne Computer 2, as well as an experiment to study the protein-based manufacturing of artificial retinas.								
15	August 10, 2021; 22:01	Antares 230+	MARS, LP-0A	Cygnus (enhanced); CRS NG-16; Ellison Onizuka	3,723 kg (8210 lbs)	LEO (ISS)	Northrop Grumman	NASA (CRS)	Success
16	February 19, 2022; 17:40	Antares 230+	MARS, LP-0A	Cygnus (enhanced); CRS NG-17; Piers Sellers	3,800 kg (8,400 lb)	LEO (ISS)	Northrop Grumman	NASA (CRS)	Success
17	November 7, 2022; 10:32	Antares 230+	MARS, LP-0A	Cygnus (enhanced); CRS NG-18; Sally Ride	3,652 kg (8,051 lb)	LEO (ISS)	Northrop Grumman	NASA (CRS)	Success
18	August 2, 2023; 00:31	Antares 230+	MARS, LP-0A	Cygnus (enhanced); CRS NG-19; Laurel Clark	3,729 kg (8,221 lb)	LEO (ISS)	Northrop Grumman	NASA (CRS)	Success
18	Final Antares 230+ launch.								

Notes:

- Cygnus CRS OA-4, the first Enhanced Cygnus mission, and Cygnus OA-6 were propelled by Atlas V 401 launch vehicles while the new Antares 230 was in its final stages of development. Cygnus CRS OA-7 was also switched to an Atlas V 401 and launched on April 18, 2017.
- Cygnus NG-20, NG-21, NG-23, the first Cygnus XL mission, and NG-24 were propelled by Falcon 9 Block 5 launch vehicles while the new Antares 330 is in its final stages of development. NG-25 will also be launched on Falcon 9.

== Future launches ==
Date / time (UTC)	Rocket variant	Launch site	Payload	Orbit	Customer
2027	Antares 330	MARS, LP-0A	Cygnus NG-22 (Enhanced Cygnus)	LEO (ISS)	NASA
2027	First flight of the Antares 330.				

== Launch sequence ==
The following table shows a typical launch sequence of Antares-100 series rockets, such as for launching a Cygnus spacecraft on a cargo resupply mission to the International Space Station. The coast phase is required because the solid-fuel upper stage has a short burn time.

Mission time	Event	Altitude
T−03:50:00	Launch management call to stations	
T−03:05:00	Poll to initiate liquid oxygen loading system chilldown	
T−01:30:00	Poll for readiness to initiate propellant loading	
T−00:15:00	Cygnus/payload switched to internal power	
T−00:12:00	Poll for final countdown and MES medium flow chilldown	
T−00:11:00	Transporter-Erector-Launcher (TEL) armed for rapid retract	
T−00:05:00	Antares avionics switched to internal power	
T−00:03:00	Auto-sequence start (terminal count)	
T−00:02:00	Pressurize propellant tanks	
T−00:00:00	Main engine ignition	
T+00:00:02.1	Liftoff	0
T+00:03:55	Main engine cut-off (MECO)	102 km (63 mi)
T+00:04:01	Stage one separation	108 km (67 mi)
T+00:05:31	Fairing separation	168 km (104 mi)
T+00:05:36	Interstage separation	170 km (106 mi)
T+00:05:40	Stage two ignition	171 km (106 mi)
T+00:07:57	Stage two burnout	202 km (126 mi)
T+00:09:57	Payload separation	201 km (125 mi)

== See also ==
- Comparison of orbital launchers families
- Minotaur-C
- Falcon 9
