= Cygnus OA-4 =

Late 2015 cargo mission to the ISS

OA-4
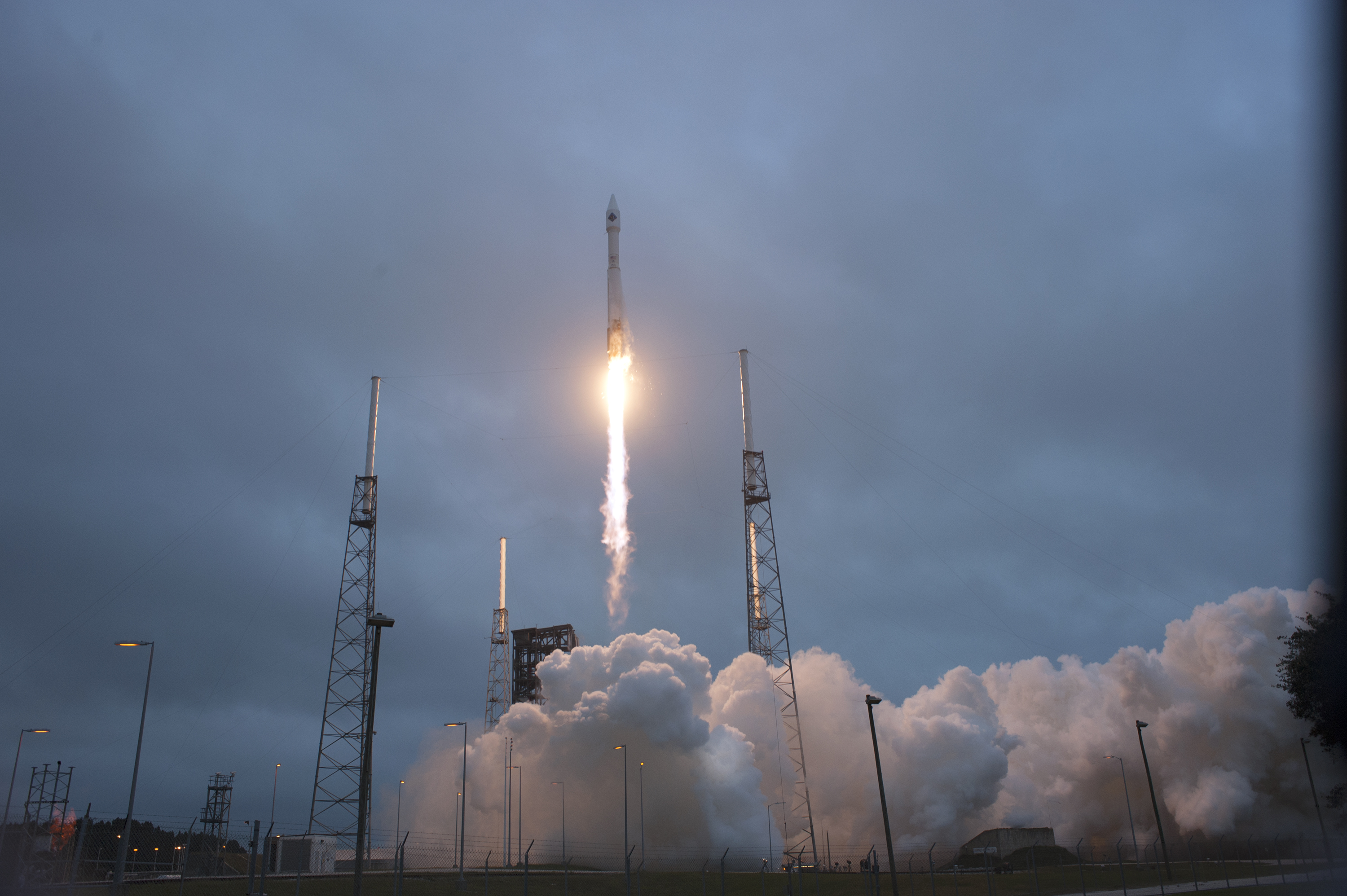
- An Atlas V 401 launches the S.S. Deke Slayton II.
- Names: CRS OA-4; CRS Orb-4 (2008–2015); Orbital-4 (2008–2015)
- Mission type: ISS resupply
- Operator: Orbital ATK
- COSPAR ID: 2015-072A
- SATCAT no.: 41101
- Mission duration: 75 days, 18 hours, 15 minutes

Spacecraft properties
- Spacecraft: S.S. Deke Slayton II
- Spacecraft type: Enhanced Cygnus
- Manufacturer: Orbital ATK; Thales Alenia Space
- Launch mass: 7,492 kg (16,517 lb)
- Payload mass: 3,513 kg (7,745 lb)

Start of mission
- Launch date: 6 December 2015, 21:44:57 UTC (4:44:57 pm EST)
- Rocket: Atlas V 401 (AV-061)
- Launch site: Cape Canaveral, SLC‑41
- Contractor: United Launch Alliance

End of mission
- Disposal: Deorbited
- Decay date: 20 February 2016, 16:00 UTC

Orbital parameters
- Reference system: Geocentric orbit
- Regime: Low Earth orbit
- Inclination: 51.64°

Berthing at ISS
- Berthing port: Unity nadir
- RMS capture: 9 December 2015, 11:19 UTC
- Berthing date: 9 December 2015, 14:26 UTC
- Unberthing date: 19 February 2016, 10:38 UTC
- RMS release: 19 February 2016, 12:26 UTC
- Time berthed: 71 days, 20 hours, 12 minutes
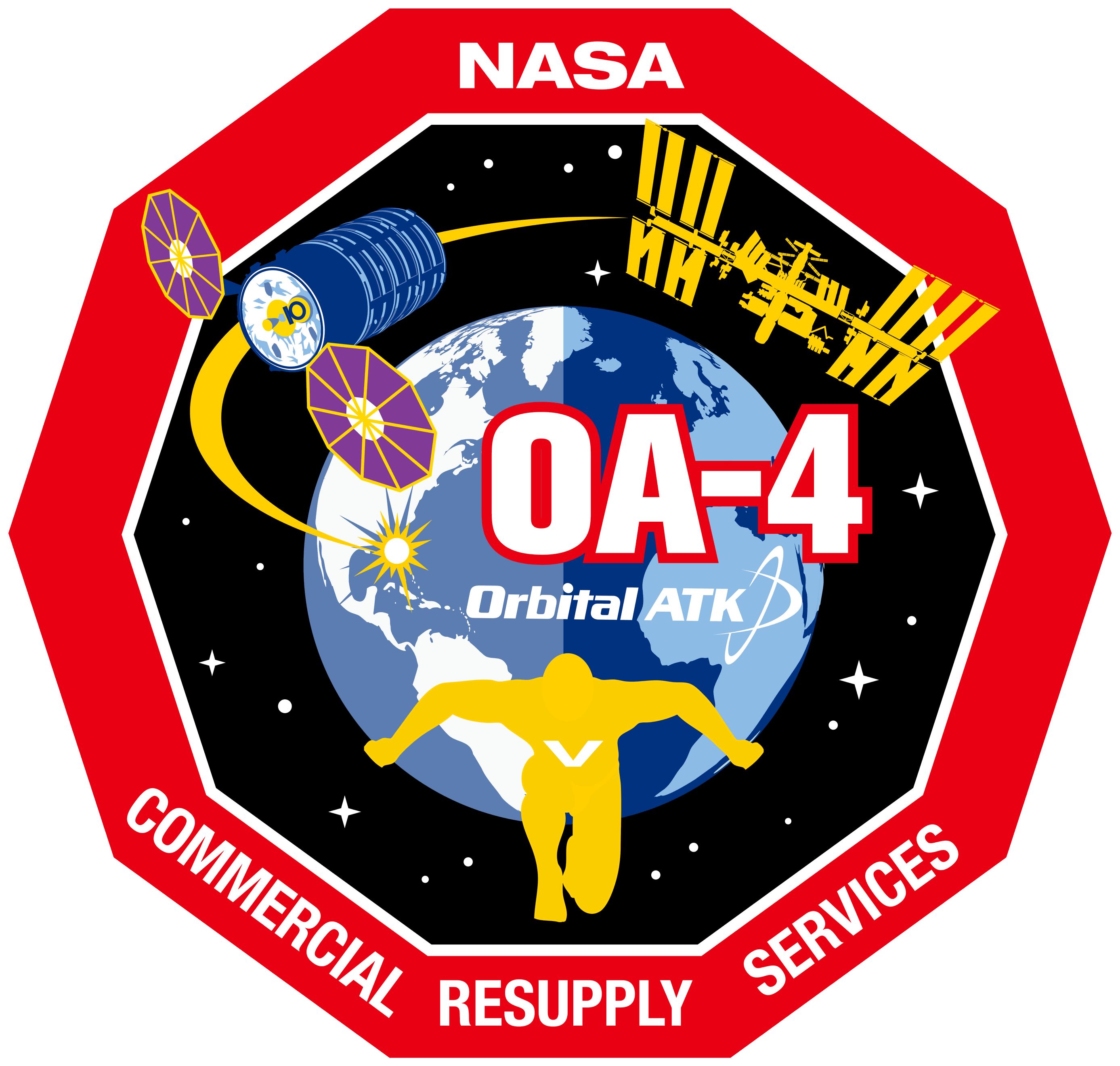
- NASA insignia Commercial Resupply Services Cygnus flights

OA-4, previously known as Orbital-4, was the fourth successful flight of the Orbital ATK uncrewed resupply spacecraft Cygnus and its third flight to the International Space Station (ISS) under the Commercial Resupply Services (CRS-1) contract with NASA. With the Antares launch vehicle undergoing a redesign following its failure during the Orb-3 launch, OA-4 was launched by an Atlas V launch vehicle. Following three launch delays due to inclement weather beginning on 3 December 2015, OA-4 was launched at 21:44:57 UTC on 6 December 2015. With a liftoff weight of 7,492 kg (16,517 lb), OA-4 became the heaviest payload ever launched on an Atlas V. The spacecraft rendezvoused with and was berthed to the ISS on 9 December 2015. It was released on 19 February 2016 after 72 days at the International Space Station. Deorbit occurred on 20 February 2016 at approximately 16:00 UTC.

== Spacecraft ==
OA-4 was the fourth of eight flights by Orbital ATK under the Commercial Resupply Services (CRS-1) contract with NASA and the inaugural flight of the larger Enhanced Cygnus PCM. The mission was originally scheduled for 1 April 2015. The Atlas V launch vehicle launched in the 401 vehicle configuration with a four-meter fairing, no solid rocket boosters and a single-engine Centaur upper stage.

In an Orbital ATK tradition, this Cygnus spacecraft was named Deke Slayton II after Deke Slayton, one of NASA's original Mercury Seven astronauts and Director of Flight Operations, who died in 1993. This spacecraft reuses the name Deke Slayton, originally applied to the Orb-3 spacecraft which was lost in an Antares rocket explosion in October 2014.

== Manifest ==
The mission was the first flight of the enhanced variant of Orbital ATK's Cygnus spacecraft, capable of delivering more than 3,500 kg (7,700 lb) of essential crew supplies, equipment and scientific experiments to the International Space Station (ISS).

Total cargo: 3,349 kilograms (7,383 lb)

- Crew supplies: 1,181 kg (2,604 lb)
  - Crew care packages
  - Crew provisions
  - Food
- Vehicle Hardware: 1,010 kg (2,230 lb)
  - Crew health care system hardware
  - Environment control and life-support equipment
  - Electrical power system hardware
  - Extravehicular robotics equipment
  - Flight crew equipment
  - PL facility
  - Structural and mechanical equipment
  - Internal thermal control system hardware
- Science Investigations: 847 kg (1,867 lb)
  - A new life science facility called the Space Automated Bio Lab (SABL) that will support studies on cell cultures, bacteria, and other micro-organisms;
  - A microsatellite deployer and the second microsatellite to be deployed from the space station;
  - The NASA LONESTAR experimental payload consisting of the AggieSat4 and Bevo-2 satellites
    - The AggieSat4 satellite, built by engineering students at Texas A&M University, deploys the smaller Bevo-2 CubeSat stored inside of it;
    - The Bevo-2 CubeSat, designed and built by engineering and computer science students at the University of Texas at Austin;
  - Experiments that will study the behavior of gases and liquids and clarify the thermo-physical properties of molten steel; and
  - Evaluations of flame-resistant textiles.
- Computer Resources: 87 kilograms (192 lb)
  - Command and data handling
  - Photo and TV equipment
- Spacewalk Equipment: 230 kg (510 lb)
  - A new SAFER jetpack
  - Extravehicular Mobility Unit (EMU) parts, including legs, gloves, tethers, and batteries
  - Airlock cooling loop parts

Total cargo with packing material: 3,513 kg (7,745 lb)

== See also ==
- Uncrewed spaceflights to the International Space Station
