= Orbital ATK =

American aerospace and defense company

Orbital ATK Inc.
- Company type: Public
- Traded as: NYSE: OA
- Industry: Aerospace, Defense
- Predecessors: Alliant Techsystems; Orbital Sciences Corporation
- Founded: February 9, 2015
- Defunct: June 6, 2018
- Fate: Acquired by Northrop Grumman
- Headquarters: Dulles, Virginia, United States
- Key people: David W. Thompson (President and CEO)
- Revenue: ▲US$1,348 million (2017)
- Net income: ▼US$61.2 million (2017)
- Total assets: ▲US$2,542 million (2017)
- Total equity: ▲US$2,045 million (2017)
- Number of employees: 13,900 (2017)
- Website: orbitalatk.com (Archived)
- Footnotes / references Financials as of December 31, 2017 (final fiscal year end); References

Orbital ATK Inc. was an American aerospace manufacturer and defense industry company. It was formed in February 9, 2015, from the merger of Orbital Sciences Corporation and parts of Alliant Techsystems (ATK). Orbital ATK designed, built, and delivered rocket engines, military vehicles, firearms, autocannons, missiles, ammunition, precision-guided munitions, satellites, missile approach warning systems, launch vehicles and spacecraft. The company was acquired by Northrop Grumman on June 6, 2018. The former Orbital ATK operations were renamed Northrop Grumman Innovation Systems and operated as a division until January 1, 2020, when a reorganization merged the operations into the company's other divisions.

== History ==
A merger of Orbital Sciences Corporation and the defense and aerospace divisions of Alliant Techsystems (ATK) was announced on April 29, 2014. The two companies had collaborated on several previous projects, including the use of 400 ATK rocket motors in Orbital's launch vehicles. The deal officially closed on February 9, 2015. ATK's sporting-goods division spun off to form Vista Outdoor on the same day.

On September 18, 2017, Northrop Grumman announced plans to purchase Orbital ATK for US$7.8 billion in cash plus assumption of US$1.4 billion in debt. Orbital ATK shareholders approved the buyout on November 29, 2017. The Federal Trade Commission (FTC) approved the acquisition with conditions on June 5, 2018, and on June 6, 2018, Orbital ATK was renamed Northrop Grumman Innovation Systems.

With Northrop Grumman's reorganization of its divisions effective January 1, 2020, Northrop Grumman Innovation Systems was split, with most of the sector merging with other Northrop Grumman businesses into a new Space Systems sector.

== Organization ==
=== Flight Systems Group ===
Based in Chandler, Arizona, the Flight Systems Group includes the Pegasus, Minotaur, and Antares launch vehicles as well as solid-propulsion and aerostructures programs. The company also operates a Lockheed L-1011 TriStar wide body jetliner, which is named Stargazer and is used to air launch Pegasus rockets carrying payloads into space. The Stargazer aircraft is also used for testing under specific programs. The Flight Systems Group became part of Northrop Grumman Space Systems on January 1, 2020.

=== Defense Systems Group ===
The Defense Systems Group, based in the Baltimore, Maryland area, produces tactical missiles, defense electronics, and medium- and large-caliber ammunition. The division also produces fuzing and warheads for both tactical missiles and munitions; precision metal and composite structures for medium and large-caliber ammunition, military aircraft, ground vehicles, and missile systems; load, assembly, and pack (LAP) of medium caliber munitions; and propellants and powders for the canister and commercial markets. The Defense Systems Group became part of Northrop Grumman Defense Systems on January 1, 2020.

=== Space Systems Group ===
Orbital ATK's Space Systems Group provides satellites for commercial, scientific, and security purposes. This group also produces the Cygnus spacecraft, which delivers cargo to the International Space Station. The group was based at the company's headquarters on Warp Drive in Dulles, Virginia.

== Products ==
=== Rockets ===
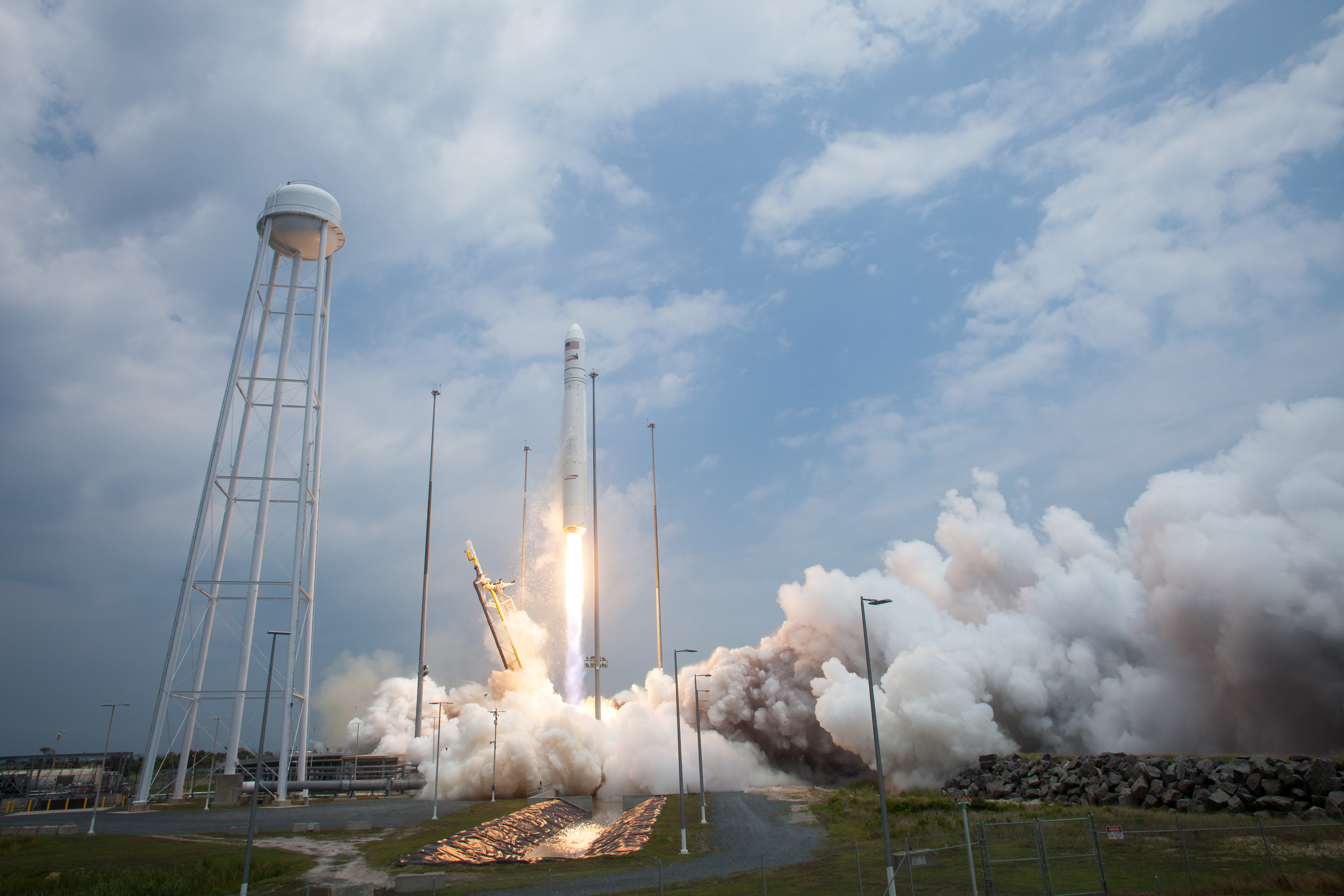
Antares rocket launches the Orb-2 mission.

- Antares, two- or three-stage medium-lift expendable launch vehicle
- Minotaur I, four-stage small-lift expendable launch vehicle
- Minotaur IV, four-stage small-lift expendable launch vehicle
- Minotaur V, five-stage launch vehicle used for geosynchronous transfer orbits and trans-lunar orbits
- Minotaur VI, five-stage medium-lift expendable launch vehicle
- Minotaur-C, four-stage small-lift expendable launch vehicle
- Pegasus, air-launched four-stage small-lift launch vehicle
- OmegA, A cancelled medium to heavy lift launch vehicle.

=== Rocket engines ===
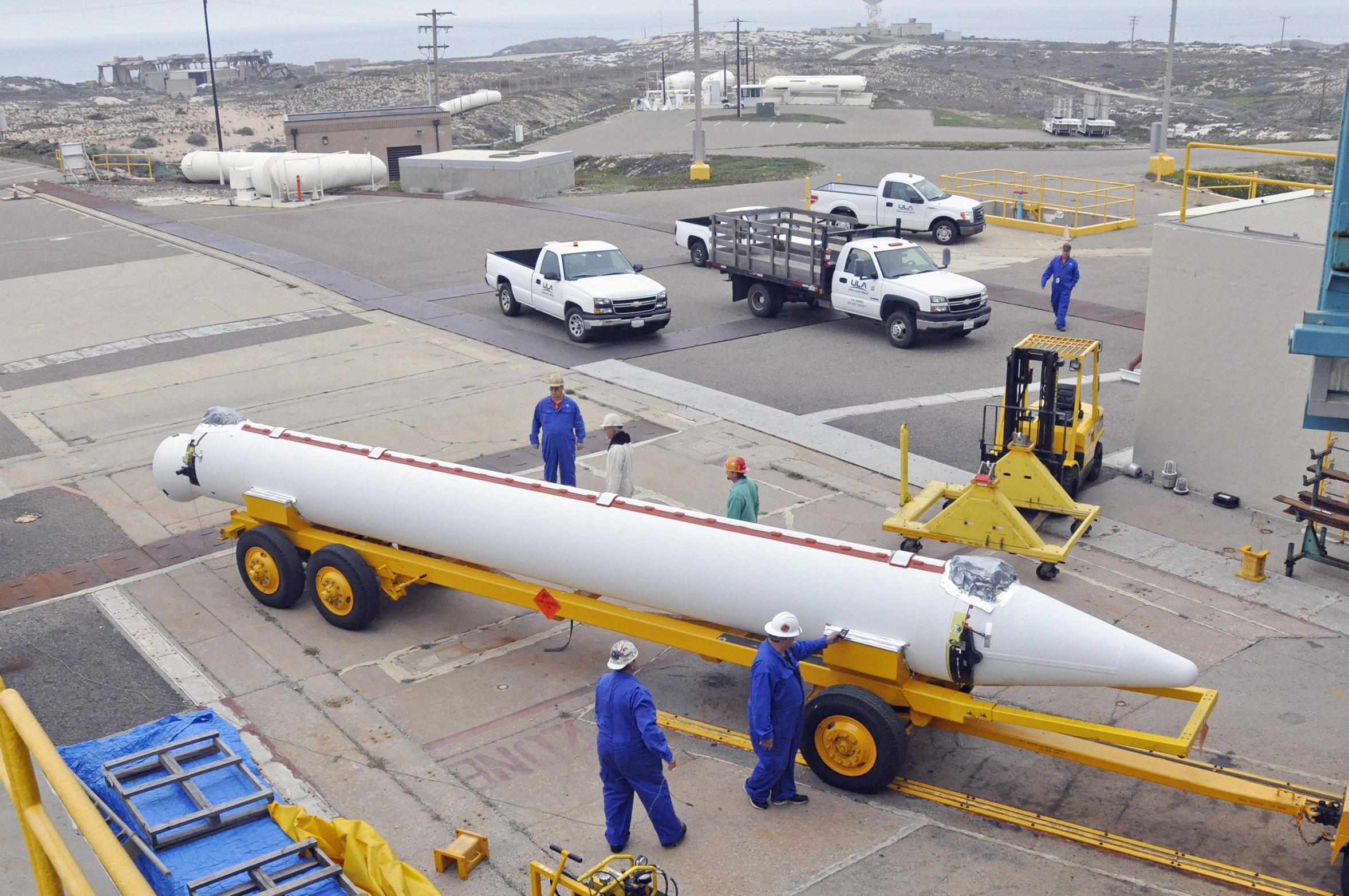
A GEM 40 solid rocket motor being prepared for integration with a Delta II launch vehicle

- GEM-40, solid rocket booster used on the Delta II rocket
- GEM-60, solid rocket booster used on the Delta IV rocket
- GEM-63, solid rocket booster used on the Atlas V rocket
- GEM-63XL, solid rocket booster used on the Vulcan rocket
- Castor 4, solid rocket used on the Maxus sounding rocket
- Castor 30, solid rocket used on the Antares rocket
- Castor 120, solid rocket used on the Minotaur-C rocket
- Space Launch System Solid Rocket Booster, based on the Space Shuttle Solid Rocket Booster

=== Spacecraft ===
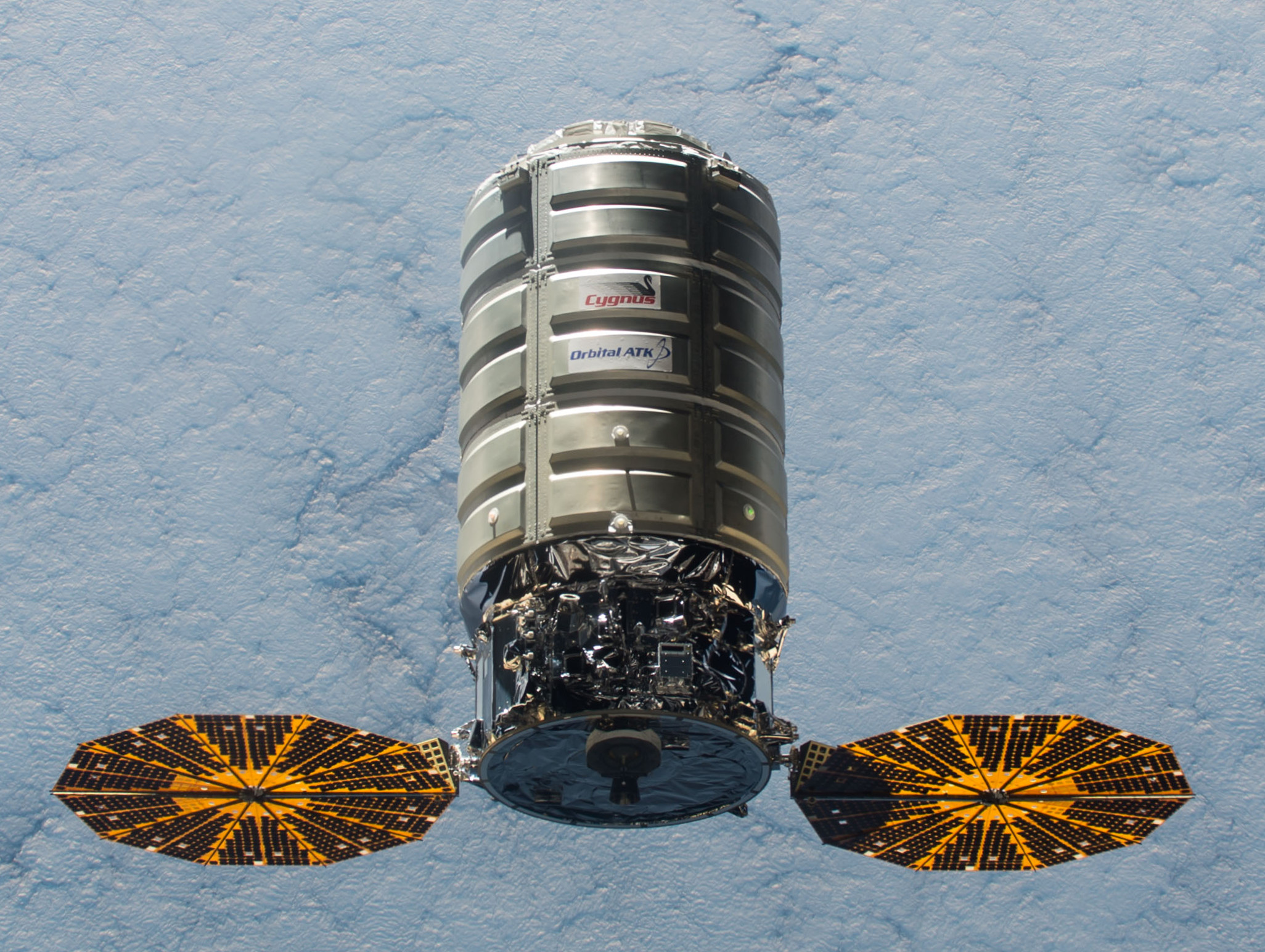
The spacecraft Cygnus transporting cargo to the ISS on behalf of NASA.

- Al Yah 3, communications satellite for Al Yah Satellite Communications
- HYLAS-4, communications satellite for Avanti Communications
- SES-16, communications satellite for SES S.A.
- Landsat 9, environmental satellite for NASA and United States Geological Survey (USGS)
- JPSS-2, weather and environmental satellite for NASA and NOAA
- ICESat-2, ice-topography satellite for NASA
- Transiting Exoplanet Survey Satellite (TESS), space telescope for NASA
- Ionospheric Connection Explorer (ICE), science mission for NASA
- Cygnus, automated cargo spacecraft to supply the ISS
- Dawn, space probe for NASA currently in decaying orbit around Ceres

=== Munitions ===
- Mk310 PABM-T air burst rounds for MK44.

=== Firearms ===
- XM25 CDTE, an airburst grenade launcher.

== See also ==
- Northrop Grumman business sectors
- Thiokol
