= DreamUp =

American space education company

- Industry: Aerospace, Education
- Founded: 2015
- Number of locations: 2
- Key people: Allen Herbert, Jeffrey Manber
- Products: educational programs
- Services: space payload integration, space launch events, career development events, STEM experiment kits and online services
- Website: dreamup.org

DreamUp PBC is a Public-benefit corporation that offers space-based educational activities. DreamUp is a spin-off and sister company of Nanoracks LLC, a private spaceflight company. Nanoracks gives DreamUp access to research opportunities on the U.S. National Lab on board the International Space Station.

DreamUp is part of XO Markets, a holding company for commercial space exploration, of which a majority stake is held by Voyager Space Holdings.

== Platforms ==
=== International Space Station ===
DreamUp provides access to facilities on the International Space Station (ISS) that include:

- Nanoracks Mixstix - 2U NanoLab research modules are dedicated to provide housing for up to twenty four individual (Mixstix) allowing all microgravity reactions and materials to be captured for analysis on the International Space Station or returned to Earth via the Cargo Dragon.
- Nanoracks Microscopes Facility – one optical microscope and one reflective microscope currently (as of February 2013) housed in research rack assemblies on the ISS which provide a USB-connection to astronaut laptop computers for analysis and downlink of image and video data to terrestrial laboratories.
- Nanoracks Centrifuge – can simulate gravity on the Moon or Mars as well as provide standard laboratory centrifuge capabilities
- Nanoracks Nanolab Platforms – include both standard space-capable lab racks to provide power and data transfer capabilities as well as CubeLabs Modules experimental platforms. Several standard rack sizes are available to accommodate nanoscale research in microgravity experiments that require various amounts of rack volume.

== Launches ==
DreamUp customers can participate in the myLAUNCH experience, a launch viewing event organized in collaboration with NASA and Nanoracks for missions to the International Space Station via SpaceX, Northrop Grumman, and other launch providers.

DreamUp myLAUNCH events to date:

- Orbital ATK's Cygnus CRS OA-6: DreamUp customers attended the OA-6 launch where DreamUp and Nanoracks flew five payloads through California-based Valley Christian Schools, an experiment from Carmel Christian High School in Matthews, North Carolina, an experiment from the Surya Institute in Indonesia, and an experiment from the SMA Unggul Del School in Indonesia.

== See also ==
- NASA
- Private spaceflight
- Center for the Advancement of Science in Space
- Blue Origin
- Space Angels Network
- SpaceX
- Dragon spacecraft
- Orbital ATK
- Orbital Sciences Cygnus
