= Manber =

Manber is a surname. Notable people with the surname include:

- Jeffrey Manber, American commercial space entrepreneur
- Udi Manber, Israeli computer scientist
