= Cygnus Orb-3 =

Failed late 2014 cargo mission to the ISS

Orbital-3
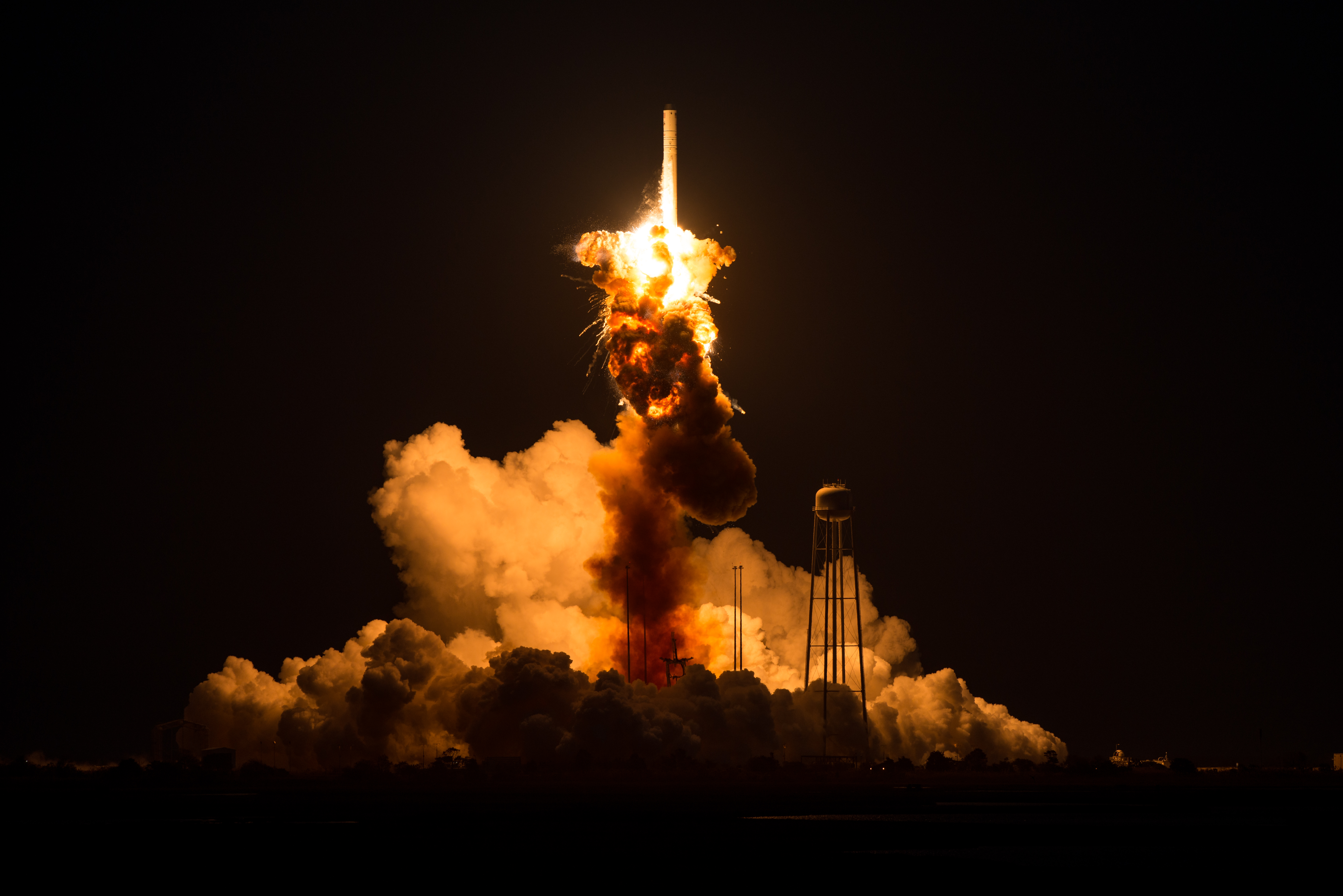
- The moment one of the Antares 130's AJ26 engines ruptures, fifteen seconds into the flight.
- Names: CRS Orb-3
- Mission type: ISS resupply
- Operator: Orbital Sciences Corporation
- Mission duration: 1 month (planned); 23 seconds (actual)

Spacecraft properties
- Spacecraft: S.S. Deke Slayton
- Spacecraft type: Standard Cygnus
- Manufacturer: Orbital Sciences Corporation; Thales Alenia Space
- Launch mass: 7,594 kg (16,742 lb)
- Payload mass: 2,215 kg (4,883 lb)

Start of mission
- Launch date: October 28, 2014, 22:22:38 UTC (6:22:38 pm EDT)
- Rocket: Antares 130
- Launch site: MARS, Pad 0A

End of mission
- Disposal: Flight termination
- Destroyed: October 28, 2014, 22:23:01 UTC (6:23:01 pm EDT)
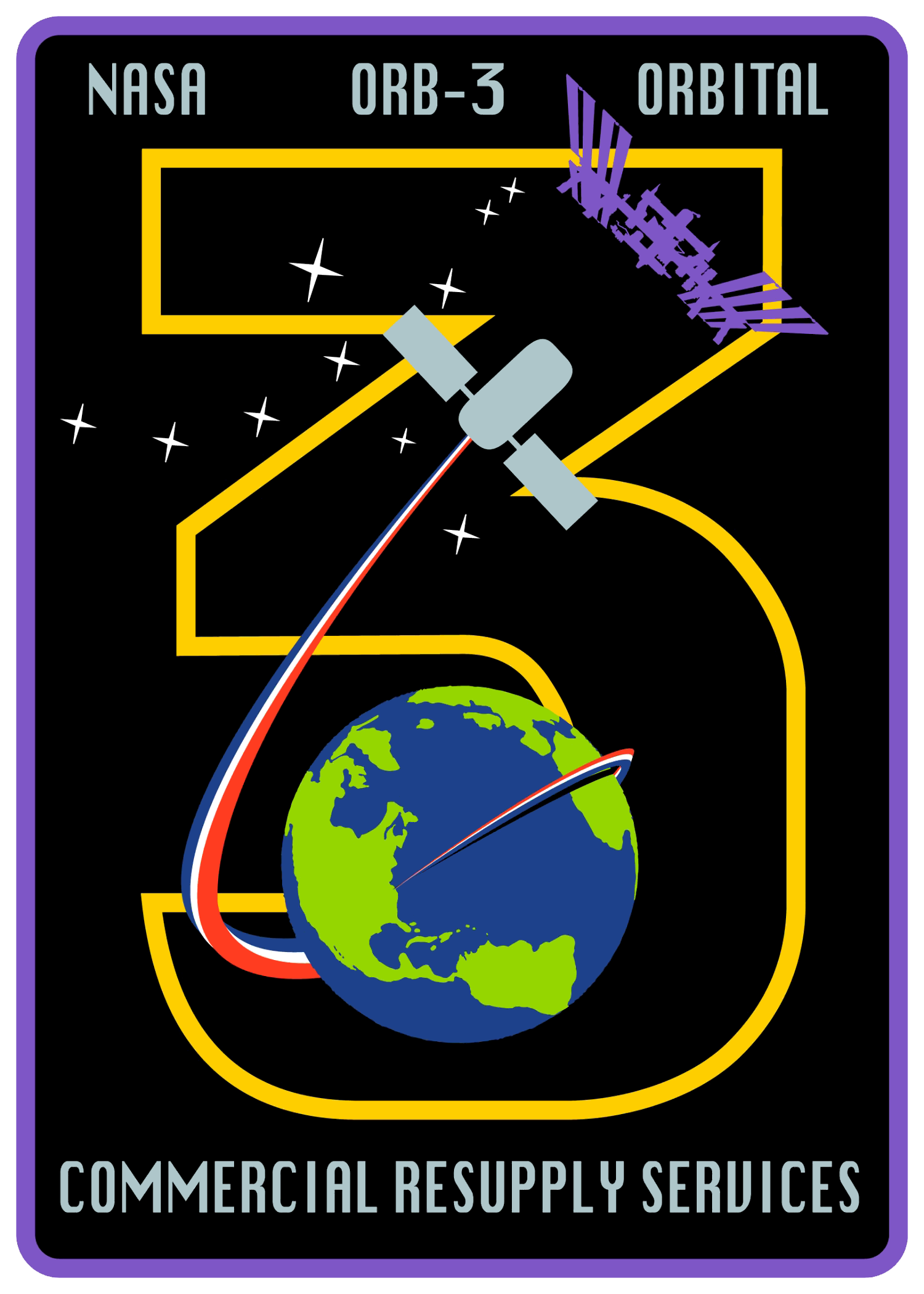
- NASA insignia Commercial Resupply Services Cygnus flights

Orbital-3, also known as Orb-3, was an attempted flight of Cygnus, an automated cargo spacecraft developed by United States–based company Orbital Sciences, on October 28, 2014. The mission was intended to launch at 22:22:38 UTC that evening. This flight, which would have been its fourth to the International Space Station and the fifth of an Antares launch vehicle, resulted in the Antares rocket exploding seconds after liftoff.

== Spacecraft ==
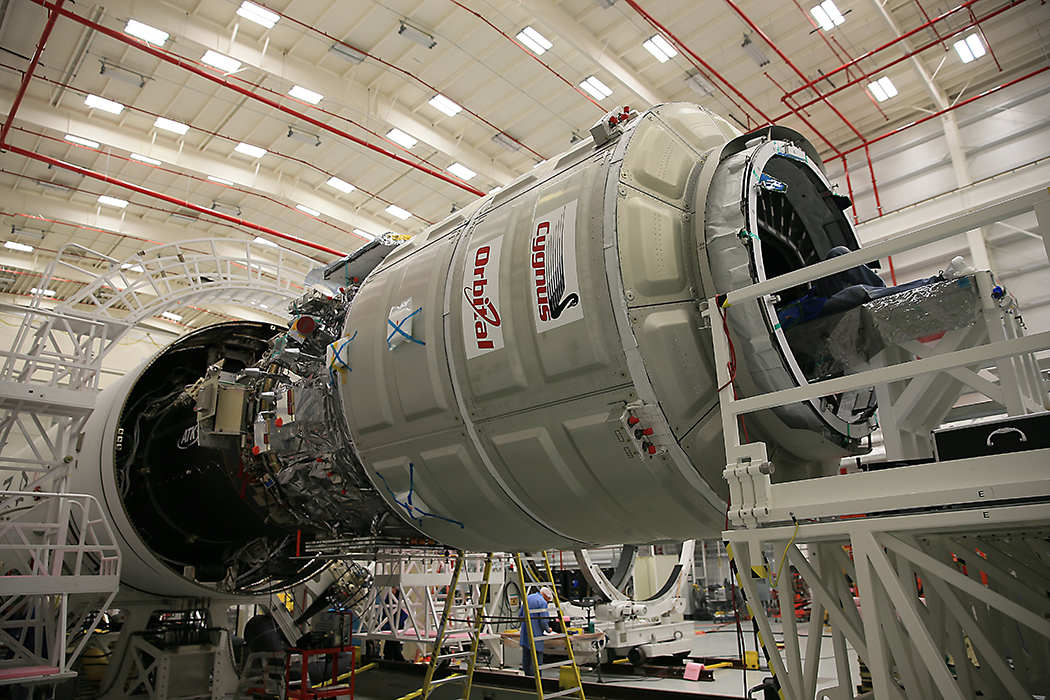
Cygnus Orb-3 spacecraft integrated with Antares rocket.

This would have been the third of eight flights by Orbital Sciences under the Commercial Resupply Services (CRS-1) contract with NASA. This was the first attempted flight of the Antares 130, which uses a more powerful Castor 30XL second stage, and the last flight of the standard-sized Cygnus Pressurized Cargo Module.

In an Orbital Sciences tradition, this Cygnus spacecraft was named S.S. Deke Slayton after one of NASA's original Mercury Seven astronauts and Director of Flight Operations, who died in 1993. As the launch failed, the next spacecraft was also named after Deke Slayton.

== Launch and early operations ==
The mission was scheduled to launch on October 27, 2014, at 22:45 UTC from the Mid-Atlantic Regional Spaceport at the Wallops Flight Facility in Wallops Island, Virginia, with rendezvous and berthing with the ISS early in the morning on November 2, 2014. This was the first night-time launch for both the Antares launcher and Cygnus spacecraft. The first launch attempt was scrubbed due to safety concerns of a sailboat entering the exclusion zone less than ten minutes before launch. A 24-hour delay was put in place, with the next launch opportunity scheduled for 22:22:38 UTC on October 28, 2014.

Attempt	Planned	Result	Turnaround	Reason	Decision point	Weather go (%)	Notes
1	27 Oct 2014, 6:45:00 pm	Scrubbed	—	Range	27 Oct 2014, 6:35 pm (T−00:10:00)		Sailboat entered the range safety zone.
2	28 Oct 2014, 6:22:38 pm	Failure	0 days 23 hours 38 minutes	Technical	28 Oct 2014, 6:23 pm (T+00:00:23)		LOX turbopump failure in the first stage engine caused the rocket to fall back onto the pad, but was destroyed by range safety.

=== Launch failure ===
Video of liftoff and explosion of rocket

The Antares rocket carrying the Orb-3 Cygnus launched as scheduled from Launch Pad 0A on October 28, 2014. Fifteen seconds after liftoff a failure of propulsion occurred in the first stage. The vehicle began falling back to the launch pad and the Range Safety Officer engaged its flight termination system just before impact.

The resulting explosion was felt in Pocomoke City, Maryland, 20 miles (32 km) away. The fire at the site was quickly contained and allowed to burn itself out overnight. Initial review of telemetry data found no abnormalities in the pre-launch, the launch sequence, and the flight, until the time of the failure.

In a press release, NASA stated that there were no known issues prior to launch and that no personnel were injured or missing but that the entire payload was lost and there was significant damage to the launch pad. On October 29, 2014, teams of investigators began examining debris at the crash site, while a survey the same day found that there was no serious damage to the launch pad and site fuel tanks, although repairs would be required.

Subsequent investigation found that the LOX turbopump had exploded, which in turn, caused a shock wave that severed surrounding propellant lines and started a fire from leaking fuel. The fire damaged various components in the thrust section leading to the engines gradually being shut down, although a specific reason for the failure could not be determined. Possible causes were a defective pump bearing, ingestion of loose debris, or a manufacturing defect.

== Payload ==
Orb-3 carried a variety of NASA-manifested payloads, some determined fairly late in the days before the launch. The Cygnus cargo vehicle carried 2,215 kg (4,883 lb) of supplies and experiments meant for the International Space Station. It included some CubeSats to be launched from the International Space Station.

=== Flock-1d ===
Planet Labs was launching Flock-1d, its next flock of 26 Earth observation nanosatellites. After the accident they stated that this would not set them back due to their approach to space involving many satellites in various constellations.

=== Arkyd-3 ===
Arkyd-3 was a 3U CubeSat technology demonstrator from private company Planetary Resources (PRI). PRI had packaged a number of the non-optical satellite technologies of its larger Arkyd-100 telescope satellite—essentially the entire base of the Arkyd-100 satellite model revealed in January 2013, but without the space telescope—into a "cost-effective box" of Arkyd 3, or A3, for early in-space flight testing as a subscale nanosatellite. The Arkyd-3 testbed satellite was packaged as a 3U CubeSat form-factor of 10×10×30 centimetres (3.9×3.9×11.8 in). PRI contracted with NanoRacks to take the A3 to the ISS where it was planned to be released from the airlock in the Kibō module.

The subsystems to be tested included the avionics, attitude determination and control system (both sensors and actuators), and integrated propulsion system that will enable proximity operations for the Arkyd line of prospectors in the future.

This near-term attempt to validate and mature the Planetary Resources satellite technology was planned to launch in October 2014, before launch and flight test of the Arkyd-100 in 2015.

=== Other payloads ===
CRS Orb-3 was carrying eighteen student experiments designed to investigate crystal formation, seed germination, plant growth, and other processes in microgravity as part of the Student Spaceflight Experiments Program (SSEP). It also carried the first open source ArduLab-powered student experiments.

Two amateur radio CubeSats, RACE and GOMX-2, were on board, among other satellites. On board GOMX-2 were two payloads. One payload was a pathfinder experiment for the Small Photon-Entangling Quantum System. designed by the Centre for Quantum Technologies. The other was a sail brake experiment to remove a CubeSat from orbit by increasing aerodynamic drag.

== Failure analysis and aftermath ==
With some preliminary investigation completed, Orbital cited the cause of the Orb-3 launch failure as likely being a turbopump failure in one of the Aerojet Rocketdyne AJ-26 engines, a refurbished Russian NK-33 engine. A NASA report from the failure investigation was released in October 2015. Although NASA and Orbital Sciences agree that the turbopump failed, they differ as to the root cause (machining or debris).

By January 2015, repairs to the Wallops Flight Facility began; they were completed in the fall of 2016. To meet its Commercial Resupply Services obligations with NASA, Orbital Sciences launched two Enhanced Cygnus cargo spacecraft via Atlas V launch vehicle—CRS OA-4 (Deke Slayton II) in December 2015 and CRS OA-6 (Rick Husband) in March 2016—while a new engine was selected and tested for the Antares launch vehicle. Orbital Sciences had been conducting an evaluation and review of an AJ-26 replacement engine prior to the incident, and in the year following the explosion they selected the NPO Energomash RD-181, the export version of the RD-191, to replace the AJ-26 on Antares. The Russians selected this same engine (RD-193), to replace the NK-33 engine used on Soyuz-2. The redesigned Antares launch vehicle flew again in 2016.

== Manifest ==
Total cargo: 2,215 kg (4,883 lb)

- Science investigations: 727 kg (1,603 lb)
  - U.S. science: 569 kg (1,254 lb)
  - International partner science: 158 kg (348 lb)
- Crew supplies: 748 kg (1,649 lb)
  - Equipment: 124 kg (273 lb)
  - Food: 617 kg (1,360 lb)
  - Flight procedure books: 7 kg (15 lb)
- Vehicle hardware: 635.7 kg (1,401 lb)
  - U.S. hardware: 605.7 kg (1,335 lb)
  - JAXA hardware: 30 kg (66 lb)
- Spacewalk equipment: 66 kg (146 lb)
- Computer resources: 37 kg (82 lb)
  - Command & data handling equipment: 34 kg (75 lb)
  - Photography/TV equipment: 3 kg (6.6 lb)

Total cargo with packing material: 2,294 kilograms (5,057 lb)

== Gallery ==
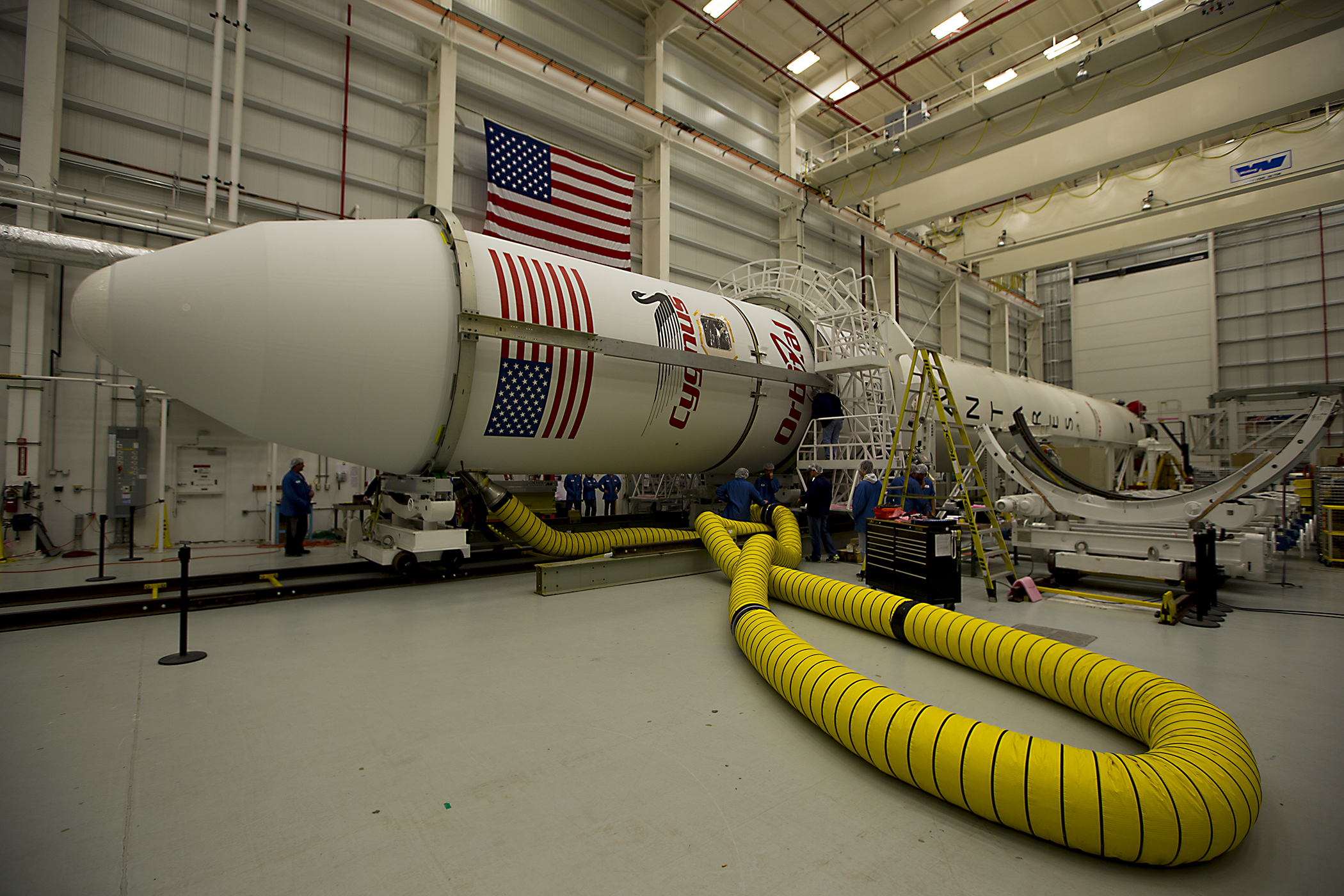
Integration of payload fairing on Antares rocket

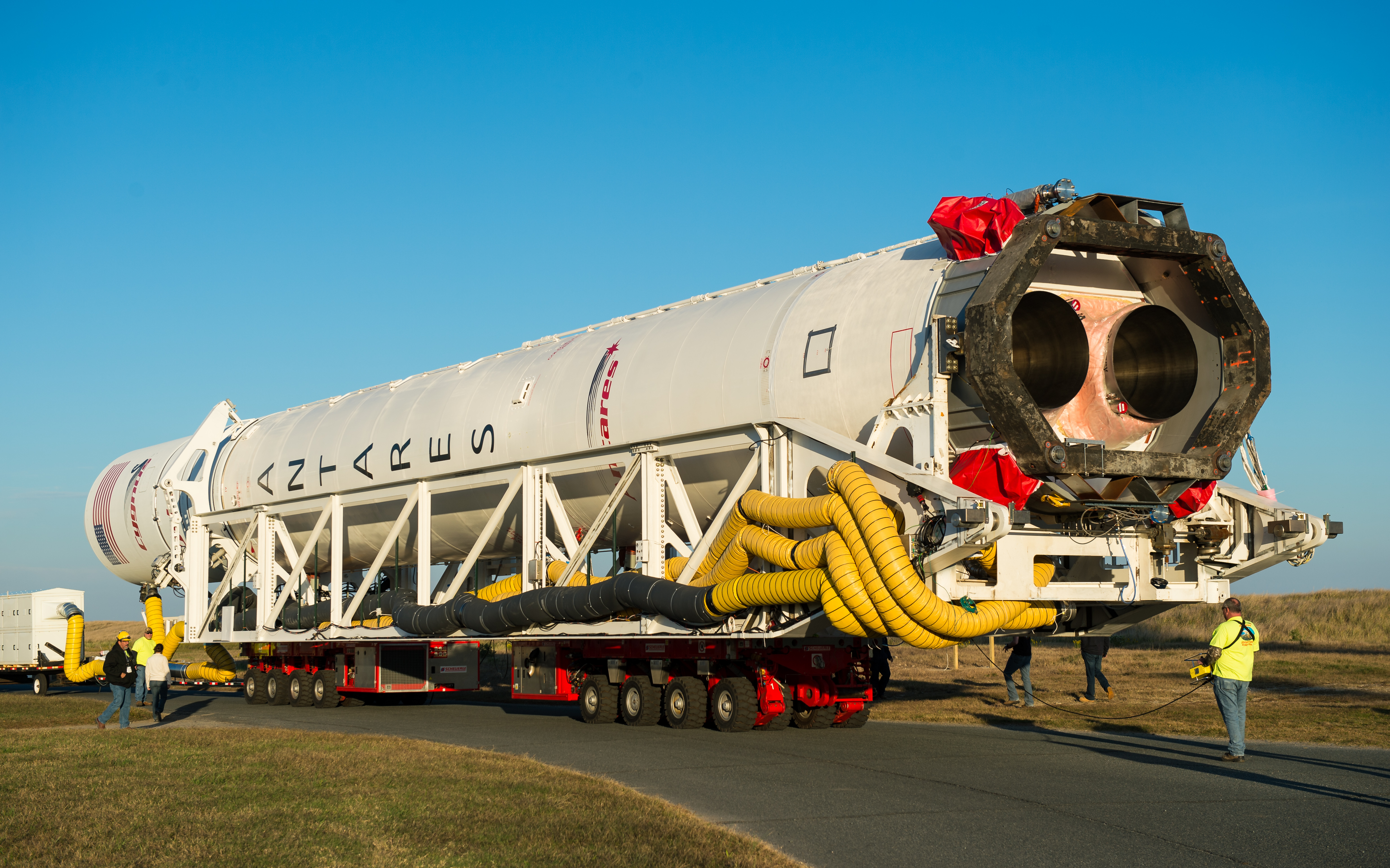
Rollout of Antares to launch pad

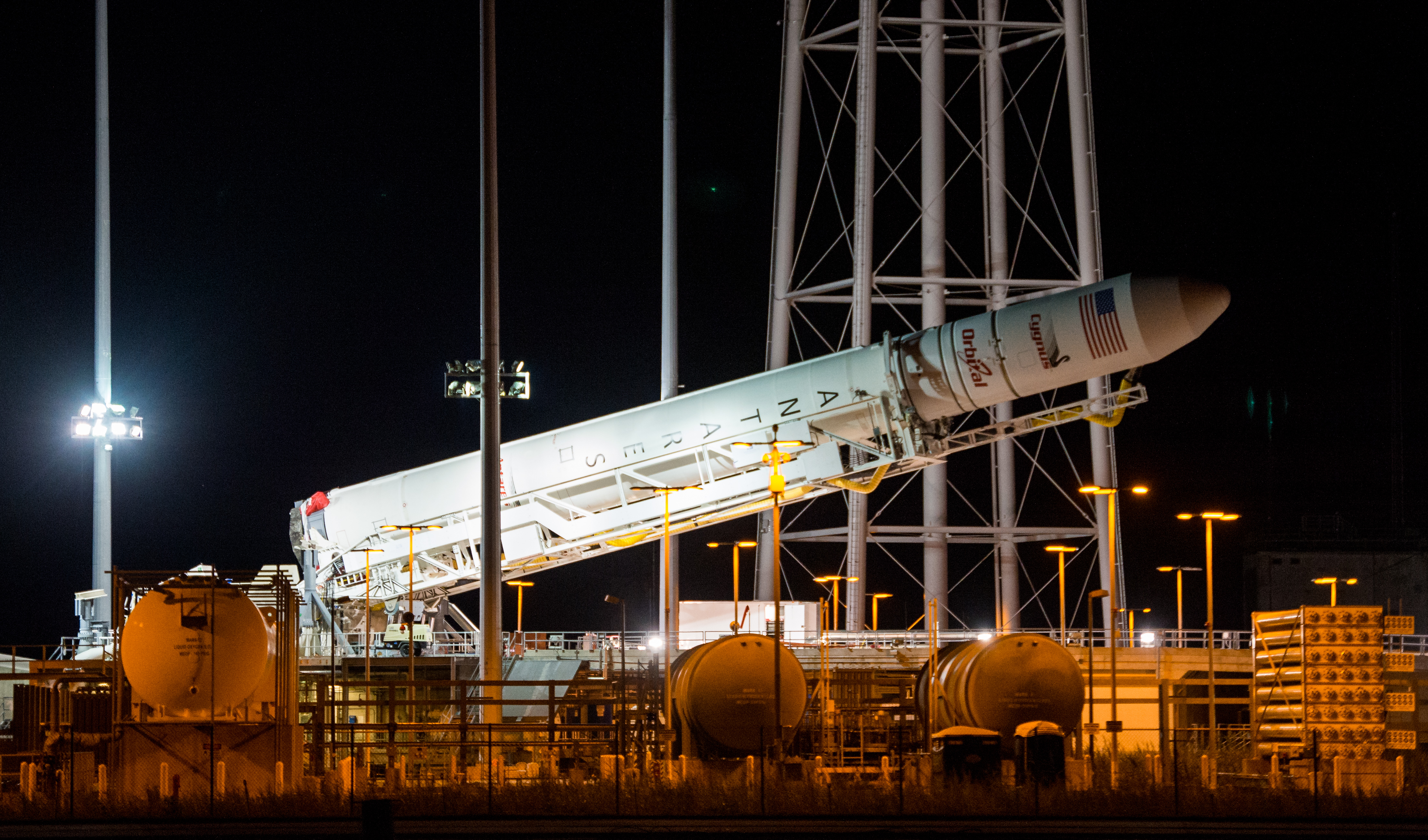
Antares being raised at pad.

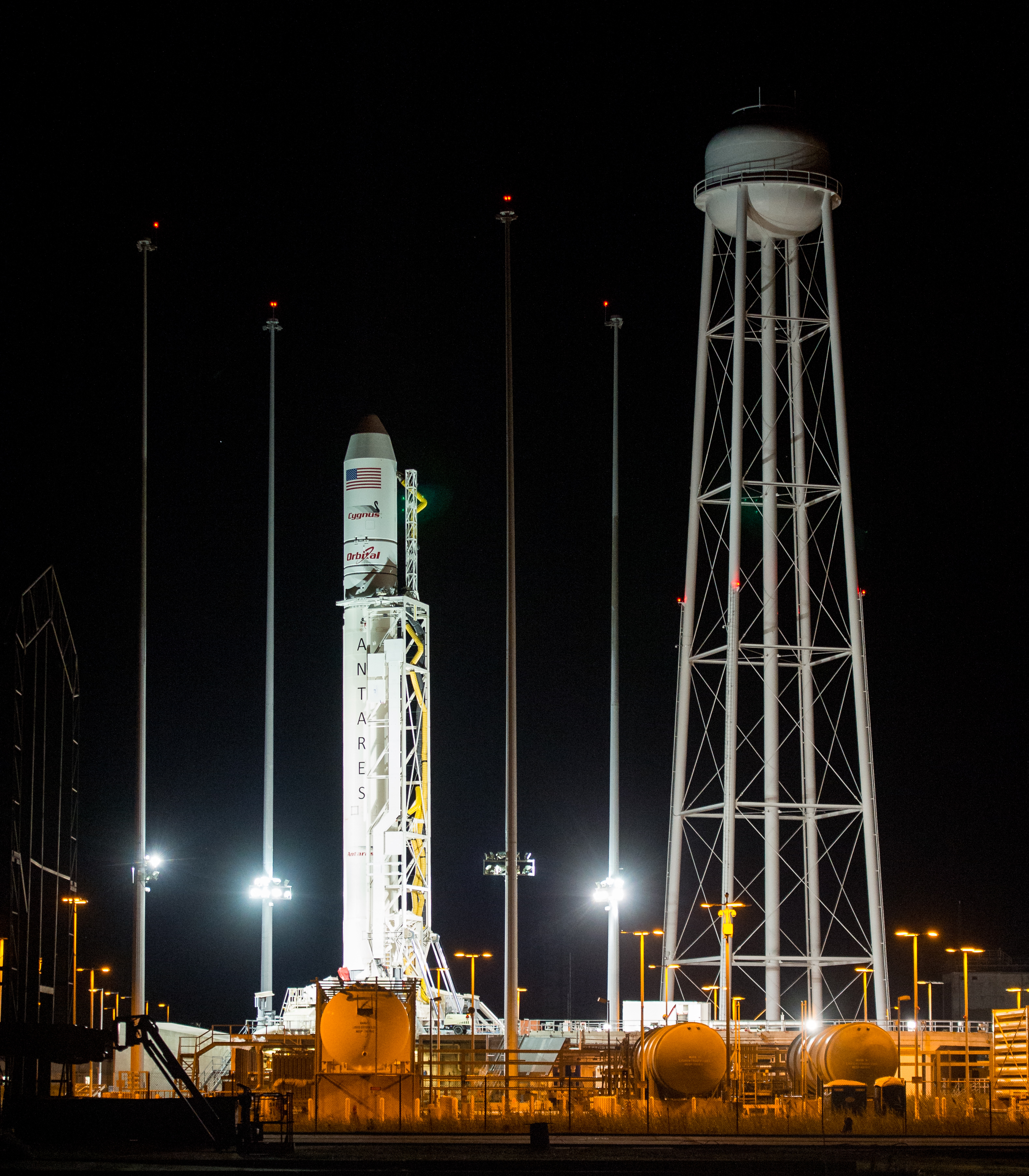
Antares vertical at pad

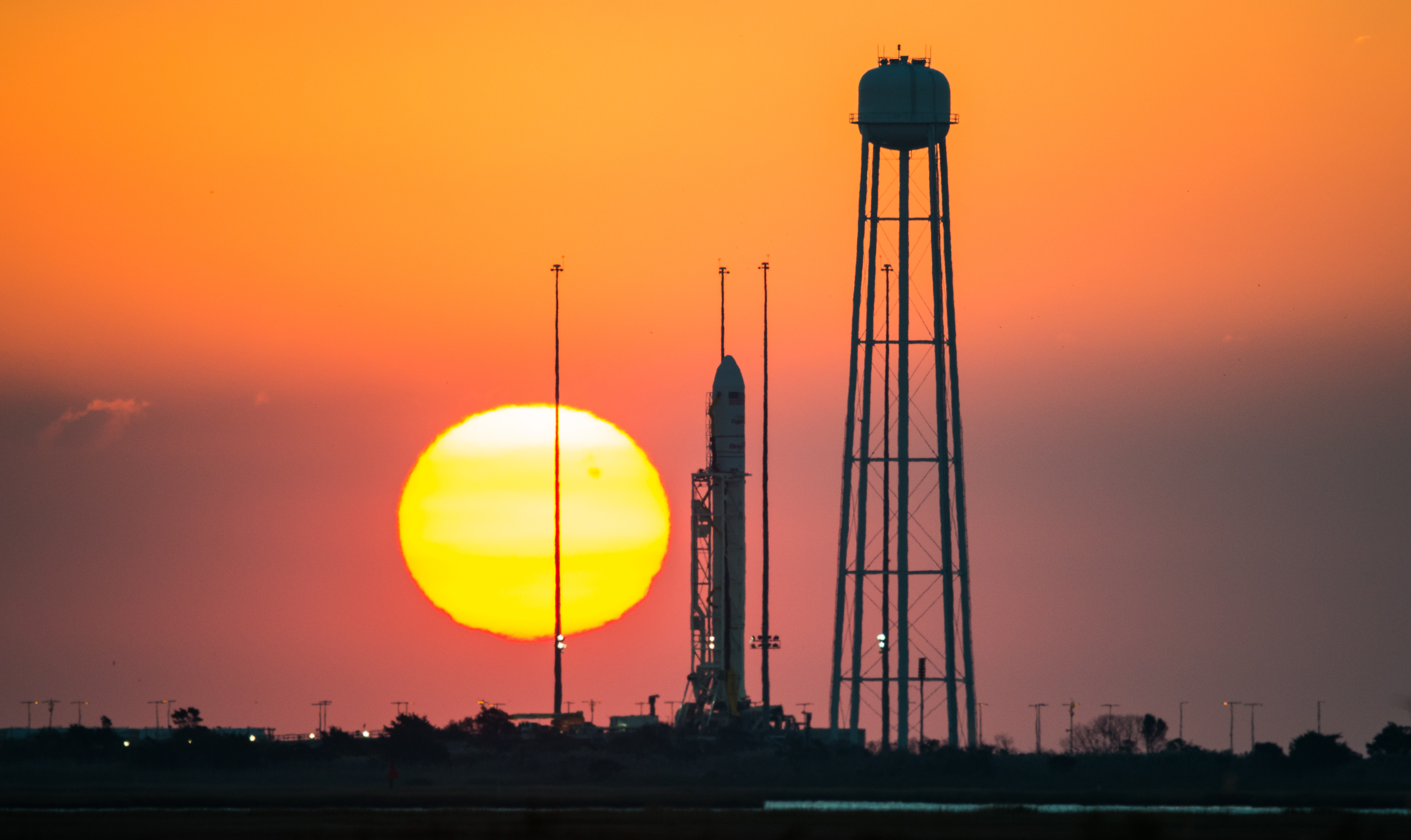
Against the disk of the rising Sun on launch day

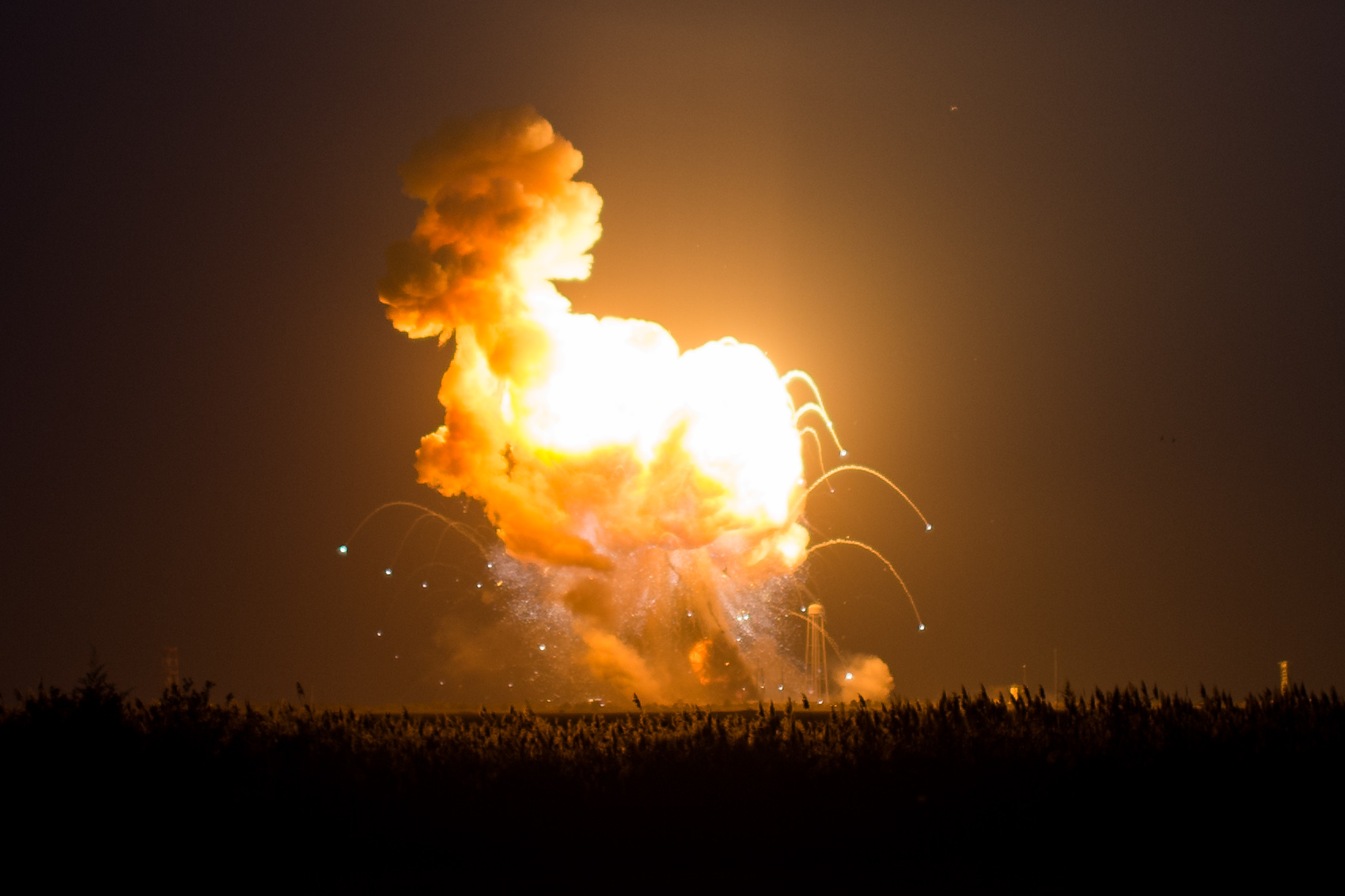
Explosion of Antares after crashing.

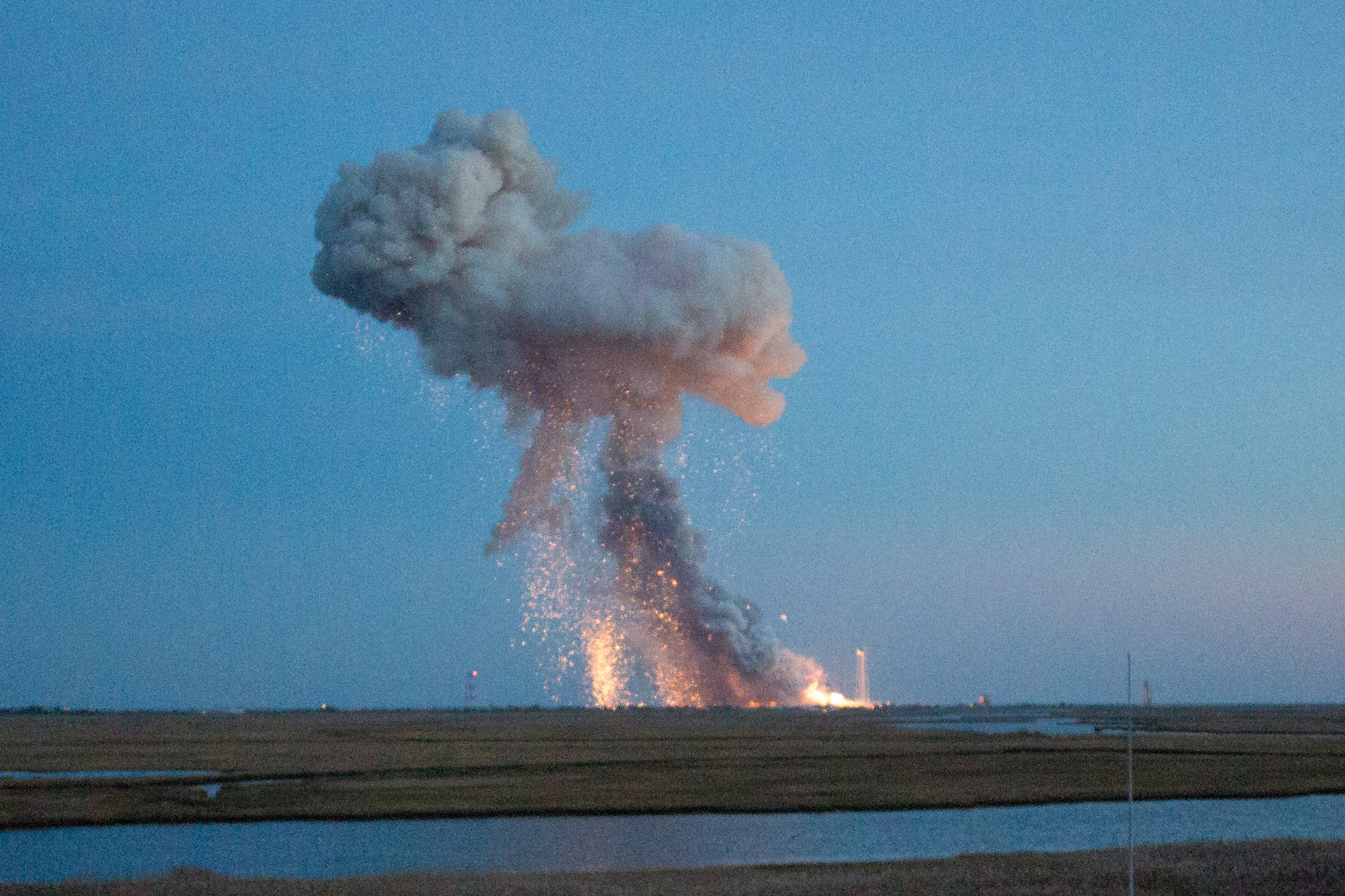
Aftermath of explosion

== See also ==
- VSS Enterprise crash, which occurred a few days after the Orb-3 crash
- SpaceX CRS-7, another Commercial Resupply Service mission that experienced a launch failure
