= SSEP =

SSEP may refer to:

- Slim Shady EP, American singer and rapper Eminem's first extended play (1997)
- Somatosensory evoked potential, means of assessing the somatosensory system
- Student Spaceflight Experiments Program, an educational program in which student experiments are flown in space
- Swiss Society of Experimental Pharmacology (see Life Sciences Switzerland)
