= Nanoracks Bishop Airlock =

Component of the International Space Station

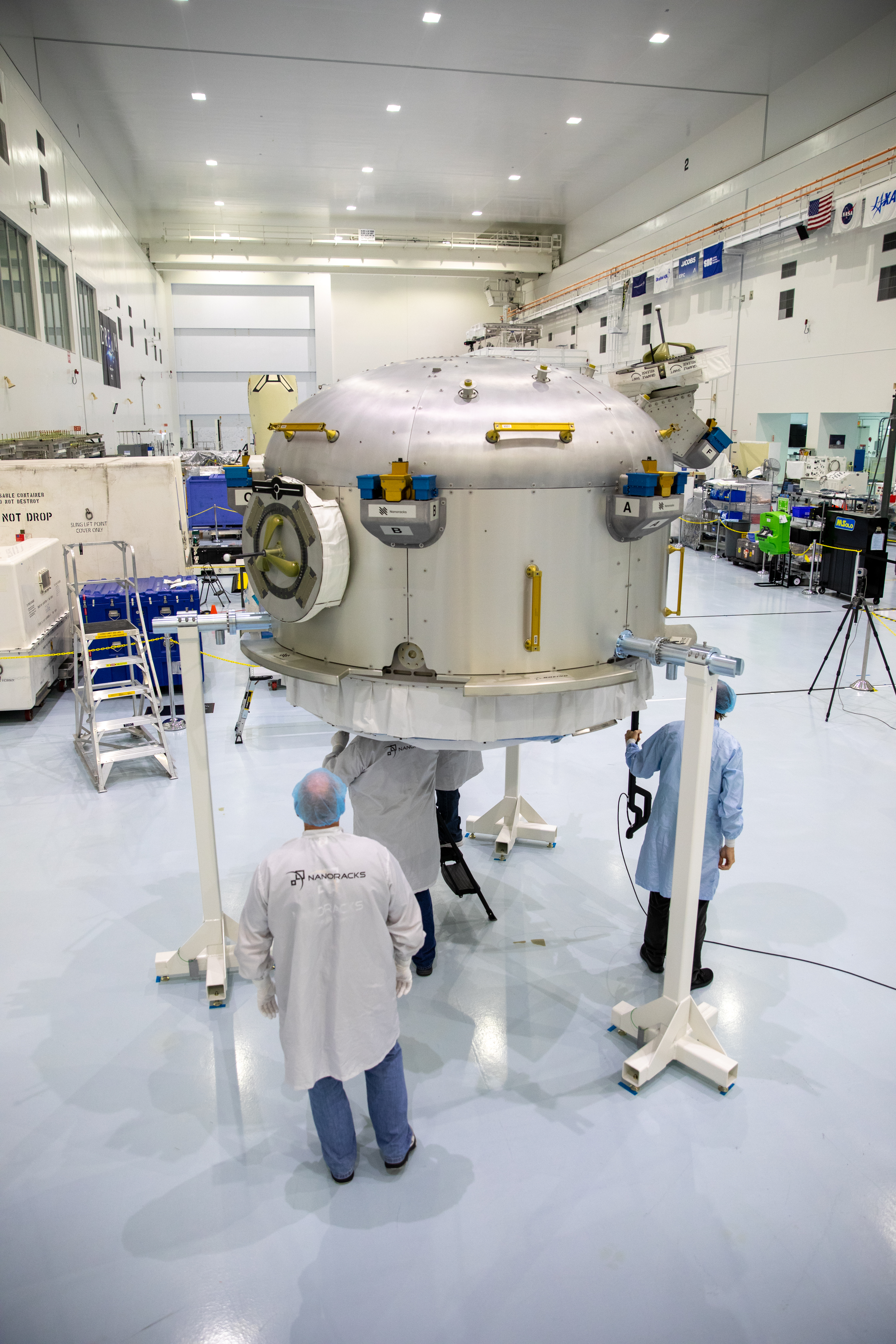
- The Nanoracks Bishop Airlock being manufactured in the Space Station Processing Facility (SSPF).

Module statistics
- Launch date: 6 December 2020, 16:17:08 UTC
- Launch vehicle: Falcon 9 Block 5 (Booster B1058.4)
- Docked: Tranquility module port
- Mass: 1,059 kg (2,335 lb)
- Height: 1.80 m (5 ft 11 in)
- Diameter: 2.014 m (6 ft 7.3 in)
- Pressurised volume: 3.99 m^{3} (141 cu ft)

Configuration
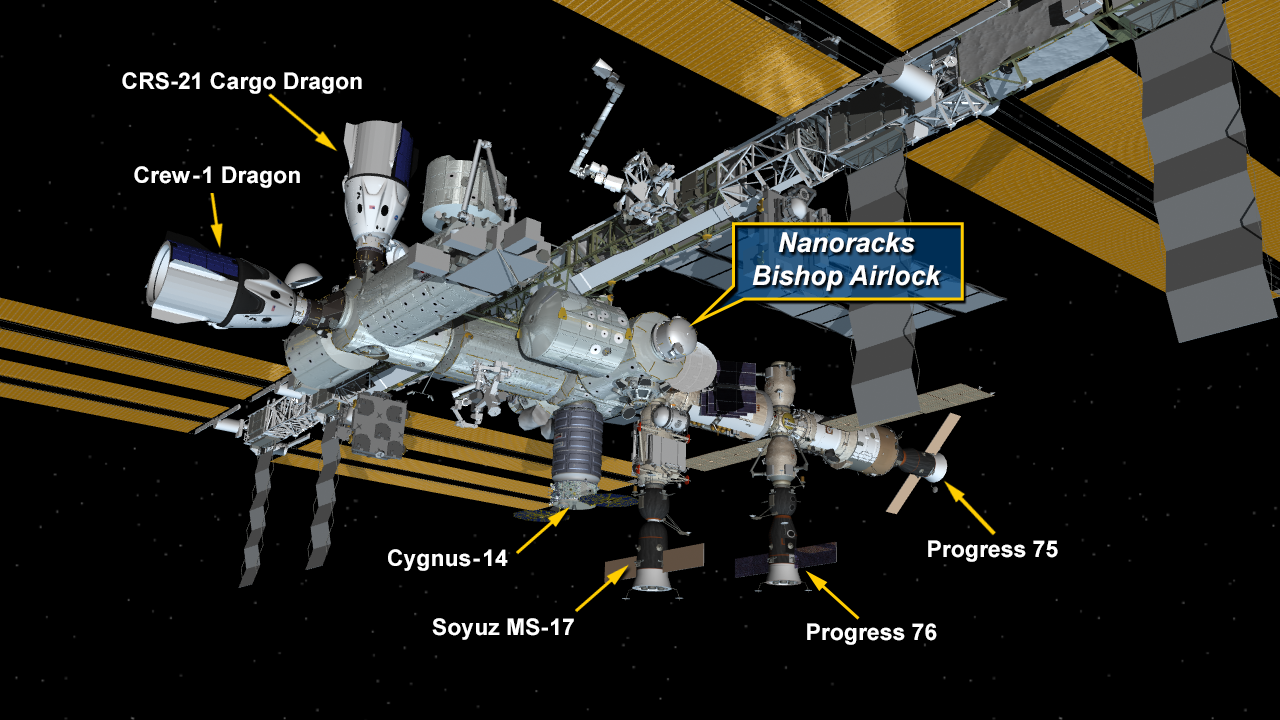
- Location of the Nanoracks Airlock Module

The Nanoracks Bishop Airlock is a commercially funded airlock module launched to the International Space Station on SpaceX CRS-21 on 6 December 2020. It was berthed to the Tranquility module on 19 December 2020 by the Canadarm2. The module was built by Nanoracks, Thales Alenia Space, and Boeing. It is used to deploy CubeSats, small satellites, and other external payloads for NASA, Center for the Advancement of Science in Space (CASIS), and other commercial and governmental customers. NASA plans on using the airlock as a brand new way to dispose large pieces of trash. The name refers to the bishop chess piece, which moves diagonally.

== Background ==
Under the International Space Station's designation as a facility of the Center for the Advancement of Science in Space, Nanoracks has an agreement with NASA to send payloads from academic and private sources for installation on the ISS' experiment racks or deployment from the equipment airlock in the Japanese Kibō module. Limitations on NASA's use of the JAXA facility created a bottleneck, prompting Nanoracks to develop their own airlock to increase satellite deployment capabilities. NASA also uses the Bishop Airlock to dispose of trash. Astronauts and cosmonauts simply dump their trash via the airlock and the trash is thrown out and burned up in the atmosphere of Earth. This helps out the chronic problem of having to keep trash inside all of the modules for months at a time while waiting for a cargo spacecraft to dump the trash.

A Space Act Agreement between NASA and Nanoracks to develop a private airlock was signed in May 2016, and the Nanoracks–Boeing plan to build and launch the module by 2019 was approved in February 2017. Originally manifested to launch on SpaceX CRS-19 in late 2019, the module was later re-manifested to launch on SpaceX CRS-21.

== Manufacturing ==
The Bishop Airlock was primarily manufactured by Nanoracks, with parts of the titanium and aluminium pressure shell made by Thales Alenia Space at their factory in Turin, Italy. Boeing manufactured the stainless steel exterior panels and Common Berthing Mechanism (CBM). The partly made components were shipped to Kennedy's Space Station Processing Facility for completion, assembly and testing.

== Airlock ==
The airlock is a four-cubic meter bell-shaped canister that attaches to the Tranquility module. It does not have hatches, instead the Canadarm2 connects to either of the two grapple fixtures in order to move the airlock on or off the station's berthing port which does have a hatch.

The second grapple fixture allows the airlock and its contents to be carried along the main truss on the Mobile Base System.

== Airlock operations at ISS ==
Typical Airlock Sortie for satellite deployment:

1. Payload satellite and deployer loaded into Airlock – Crew
2. SSRMS grapple of Airlock – Ground
3. Transfer of Airlock power from Node 3 to SSRMS - Ground
4. Airlock power and data cables, IMV, and EWC coax cable disconnect – Crew
5. Install CBM Controller Panel Assemblies - Crew
6. Hatch closure and Air Save Pump hookup to hatch Equalization Valve – Crew
7. Air Save Pump depress – Ground
8. Vestibule residual air depress – Ground
9. CBM bolt disengage – Ground
10. SSRMS maneuver to deploy position – Ground
11. Satellite deployment – Ground
12. SSRMS maneuver back to Node 3 Port and berth Airlock (without CBCS) – Ground
13. Air Save Pump repress and leak check – Ground
14. Open Hatch – Crew
15. Relocate CBM Controller Panel Assemblies - Crew
16. Reconnect power and data cables, IMV, and EWC coax cable to Airlock – Crew
17. Transfer of Airlock power from SSRMS to Node 3 - Ground
18. SSRMS ungrapple - Ground
19. Remove payload deployer hardware left behind and stow - Crew
