= Student Spaceflight Experiments Program =

Science educational outreach and spaceflight program

- Founders: Jeff Goldstein, director, NCESSE
- Established: June 2010
- Mission: STEM student outreach
- Head: Jeff Goldstein
- Key people: Stacy Hamel, Senior Flight Operations Manager; John Hamel, Flight Operations Manager; Kirsten Weimer, Education Program Coordinator; Drew Roman, Technology Manager; Harri Vanhala, Science Advisor; Tim Livengood, Science Advisor; Michael Hulslander, Education Advisor
- Website: http://ssep.ncesse.org/

The Student Spaceflight Experiments Program (SSEP) provides an opportunity for student groups from upper elementary school through university to design and fly microgravity experiments in low Earth orbit (LEO). SSEP is a program of the National Center for Earth and Space Science Education (NCESSE, a project of the Tides Center), the Arthur C. Clarke Institute for Space Education, and the private space hardware company NanoRacks. SSEP operates under a Space Act Agreement between the sponsoring organizations and NASA, allowing the International Space Station (ISS) to be utilized as a national laboratory.

== History ==
The program was launched in June 2010, by NCESSE in the U.S. and by the Clarke Institute internationally. As of 2018, SSEP has sponsored fourteen missions to LEO – two on board the Space Shuttle, and twelve to the ISS – with a thirteenth mission to the ISS announced in March 2018, and expected to fly in the spring/summer of 2019.

In the first fourteen SSEP flight opportunities, 86,800 students in grades 5 through 16 (senior undergraduate in the U.S. higher education system) participated in experiment design and proposal writing. Of 18,759 proposals received, a total of 240 experiments were selected for flight, with one from each community participating in each flight opportunity. As of 14 August 2017, 206 of these experiments have been successfully launched. The 18 experiments comprising Mission 6 to the ISS were lost when the Cygnus CRS Orb-3 vehicle exploded shortly after launch on 28 October 2014.

=== Key dates ===
Date	Event
01 Jun 2010	Program start
16 May 2011	STS-134 launch (Endeavour)
08 Jul 2011	STS-135 launch (Atlantis)
22 May 2012	M1 launch (SpaceX-D1)
07 Oct 2012	M2 launch (CRS-1)
18 Sep 2013	M3a launch (Orb-D1)
09 Jan 2014	M3b/M4 launch (Orb-1)
13 Jul 2014	M5 launch (Orb-2)
28 Oct 2014	M6 launch (Cygnus CRS Orb-3 failure)
10 Jan 2015	M6 launch (CRS-5)
28 Jun 2015	M7 launch (CRS-7 failure)
08 Apr 2016	M7 launch (CRS-8)
18 Jul 2016	M8 launch (CRS-9)
19 Feb 2017	M9 launch (CRS-10)
03 Jun 2017	M10 launch (CRS-11)
14 Aug 2017	M11 launch (CRS-12)
29 Jun 2018	M12 launch (CRS-15)
25 July 2019	M13 launch (CRS-18)
06 Dec 2020	M14A launch (CRS-21)
03 Jun 2021	M14B/M15A launch planned (CRS-22)
18 Aug 2021	M14C/M15B launch planned (CRS-23)
26 Nov 2022	M16 launch (CRS-26)

== Process ==
The competition to select student projects for flight is designed to resemble a standard research proposal process. Interested groups must submit proposals in response to announced criteria; these proposals are then peer-reviewed against the criteria in a two-stage selection process, with the vast majority of proposals rejected.

Each selected experiment is provided with one mini-laboratory, which is flown on the ISS and then returned to Earth for analysis. Experiments selected for flight have included research into crystal growth, composting, cell division, seed germination, and calcium metabolism. The cost of each experiment is on the order of US$24,500, which must be raised by the community developing the experiment.

Students have an opportunity to share their research at a national conference sponsored by the Smithsonian National Air and Space Museum, NCESSE, and the Clarke Institute. Students participating in the program have also been given the chance to participate in a videoconference with space station astronauts.
