= SpaceX CRS-21 =

2020 American resupply spaceflight to the ISS

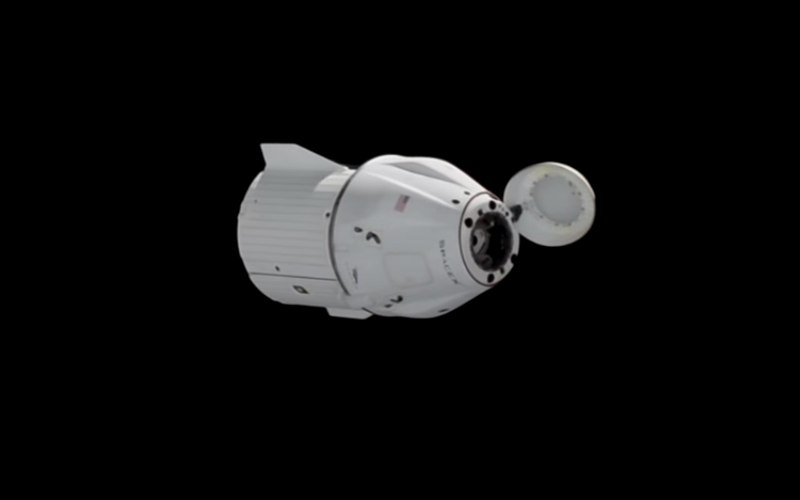
- CRS-21 undocks from ISS
- Names: SpX-21
- Mission type: ISS resupply
- Operator: SpaceX
- COSPAR ID: 2020-093A
- SATCAT no.: 47233
- Website: https://www.spacex.com/
- Mission duration: 38 days, 9 hours, 9 minutes

Spacecraft properties
- Spacecraft: Cargo Dragon C208
- Spacecraft type: Cargo Dragon
- Manufacturer: SpaceX
- Launch mass: 6,000 kg (13,000 lb)
- Payload mass: 2,972 kg (6,552 lb)

Start of mission
- Launch date: 6 December 2020, 16:17:08 UTC
- Rocket: Falcon 9 Block 5 B1058-4
- Launch site: Kennedy Space Center, LC-39A

End of mission
- Recovered by: MV GO Navigator
- Landing date: 14 January 2021, 01:26 UTC
- Landing site: Gulf Coast

Orbital parameters
- Reference system: Geocentric orbit
- Regime: Low Earth orbit
- Inclination: 51.66°

Docking with ISS
- Docking port: Harmony zenith
- Docking date: 7 December 2020, 18:40 UTC
- Undocking date: 12 January 2021, 14:05 UTC
- Time docked: 35 days, 19 hours, 25 minutes

Cargo
- Mass: 2,972 kg (6,552 lb)
- Pressurised: 1,882 kg (4,149 lb)
- Unpressurised: 1,090 kg (2,400 lb)
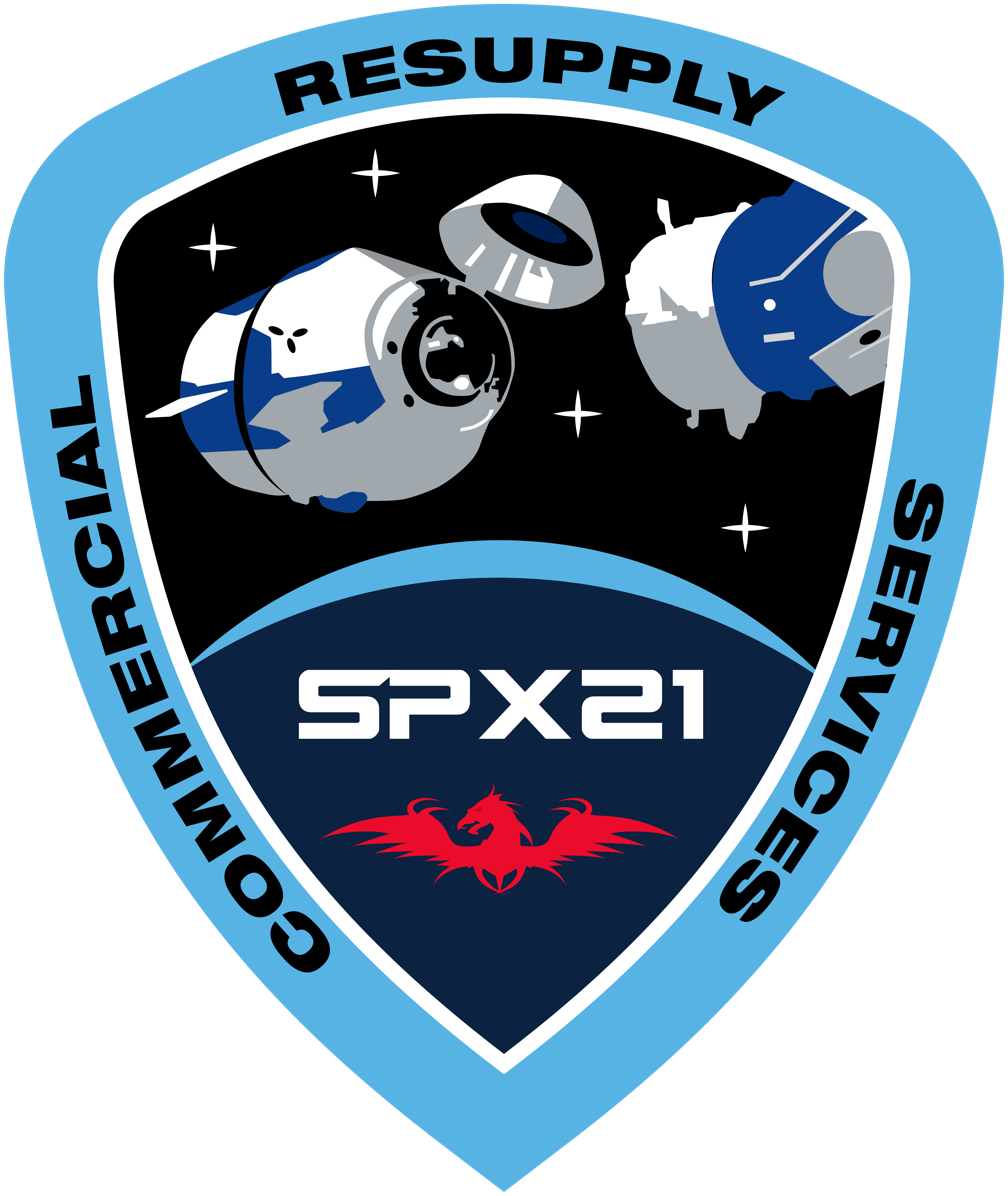
- SpaceX CRS-21 mission patch Commercial Resupply Services Cargo Dragon flights

SpaceX CRS-21, also known as SpX-21, was a Commercial Resupply Service mission to the International Space Station which launched on 6 December 2020. The mission was contracted by NASA and was flown by SpaceX using a Cargo Dragon 2. This was the first flight for SpaceX under NASA's CRS Phase 2 contract awarded in January 2016. This was also the first Cargo Dragon of the new Dragon 2 variant, as well as the first Cargo Dragon flight that was docked at the same time as a Crew Dragon spacecraft (SpaceX Crew-1). This mission used Booster B1058.4, becoming the first NASA mission to reuse a booster previously used on a non-NASA mission. This was also first time SpaceX launched a NASA payload on a booster with more than one previous flight.

== Cargo Dragon ==
SpaceX plans to reuse the Cargo Dragons up to five times. It was launched without seats, cockpit controls, the life support system required to sustain astronauts in space and SuperDraco abort engines. Dragon 2 improves on Dragon 1 in several ways, including lessened refurbishment time, leading to shorter periods between flights.

While CRS-21 was for a standard 30 days mission, the most recent Flight Planning Integration Panel (FPIP) document indicates that beginning with CRS-23, SpaceX cargo missions will begin to stretch out to 60 days and beyond. Sarah Walker, director of Dragon mission management at SpaceX, said "the new Cargo Dragon can stay at the space station for up to 75 days, more than twice as long as the first-generation Dragon spacecraft".

With this mission, this was the first time that two Dragon capsules were docked at the ISS at the same time.

Beginning with the CRS-21 mission, the new Dragon Cargo capsules splash down under parachutes off the coast of Florida in either the Atlantic Ocean or the Gulf of Mexico. This NASA preference was added to CRS-2 awards.

== Mission ==
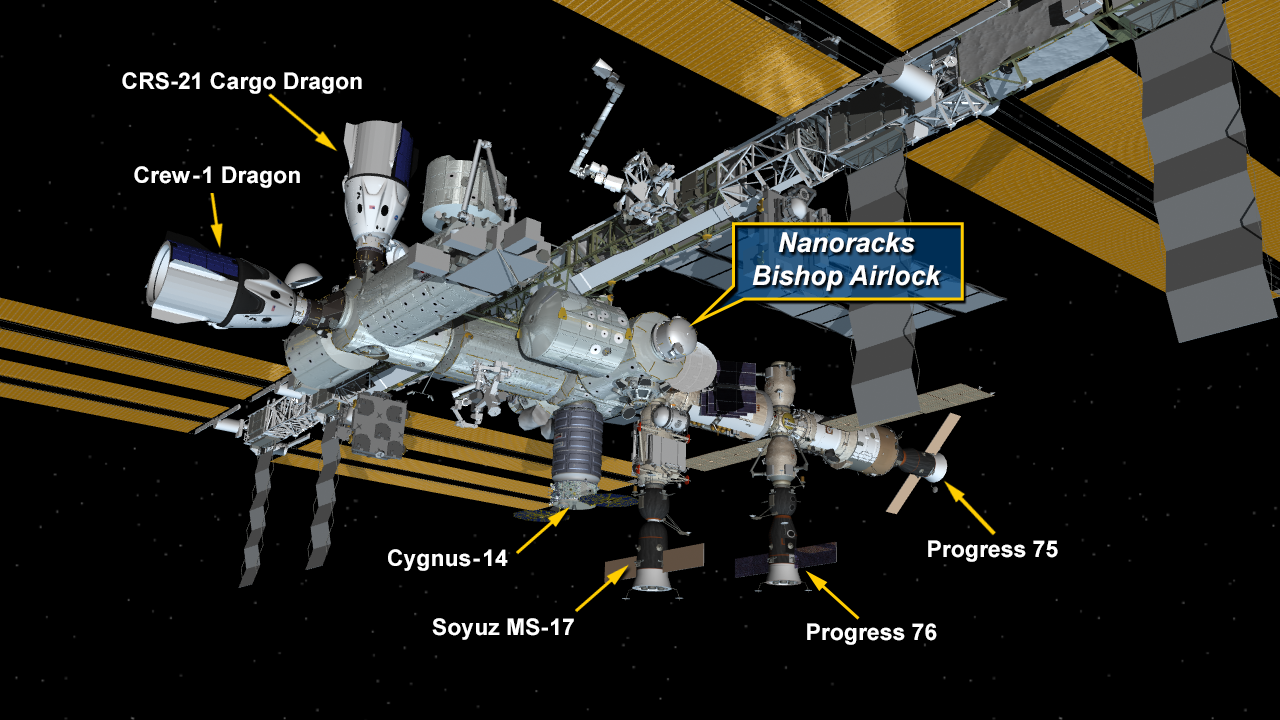
Configuration with the new Nanoracks Bishop Airlock

=== Timeline ===
T+00:00: Liftoff
T+01:18: Maximum aerodynamic pressure
T+02:30: First stage main engine cutoff (MECO)
T+02:34: Stage separation
T+02:41: Second stage engine start
T+06:37: First stage entry burn begins
T+08:38: Second stage engine cutoff (SECO)
T+08:38: First stage landing on drone ship
T+11:49: Dragon separation
T+12:35: Dragon nose cone open sequence begins

=== Return ===
Dragon undocked from the ISS on 12 January 2021 at 14:05 UTC. SpaceX recovery teams were on standby for the parachute-assisted splashdown on 14 January 2021 at 01:26 UTC in the Gulf of Mexico, west of Tampa, Florida. Dragon returned to Earth with 2,002 kg (4,414 lb) of cargo, according to NASA.

== Payload ==
NASA contracted for the CRS-21 mission from SpaceX and therefore determines the primary payload, date of launch, and orbital parameters for the Cargo Dragon. The CRS-21 mission carries 2,972 kg (6,552 lb) of cargo to ISS.

- Science investigations: 953 kg (2,101 lb)
- Vehicle hardware: 317 kg (699 lb)
- Crew supplies: 364 kg (802 lb)
- Spacewalk equipment: 120 kg (260 lb)
- Computer resources: 46 kg (101 lb)
- Russian hardware: 24 kg (53 lb)
- External payload (Nanoracks Bishop Airlock): 1,090 kg (2,400 lb)

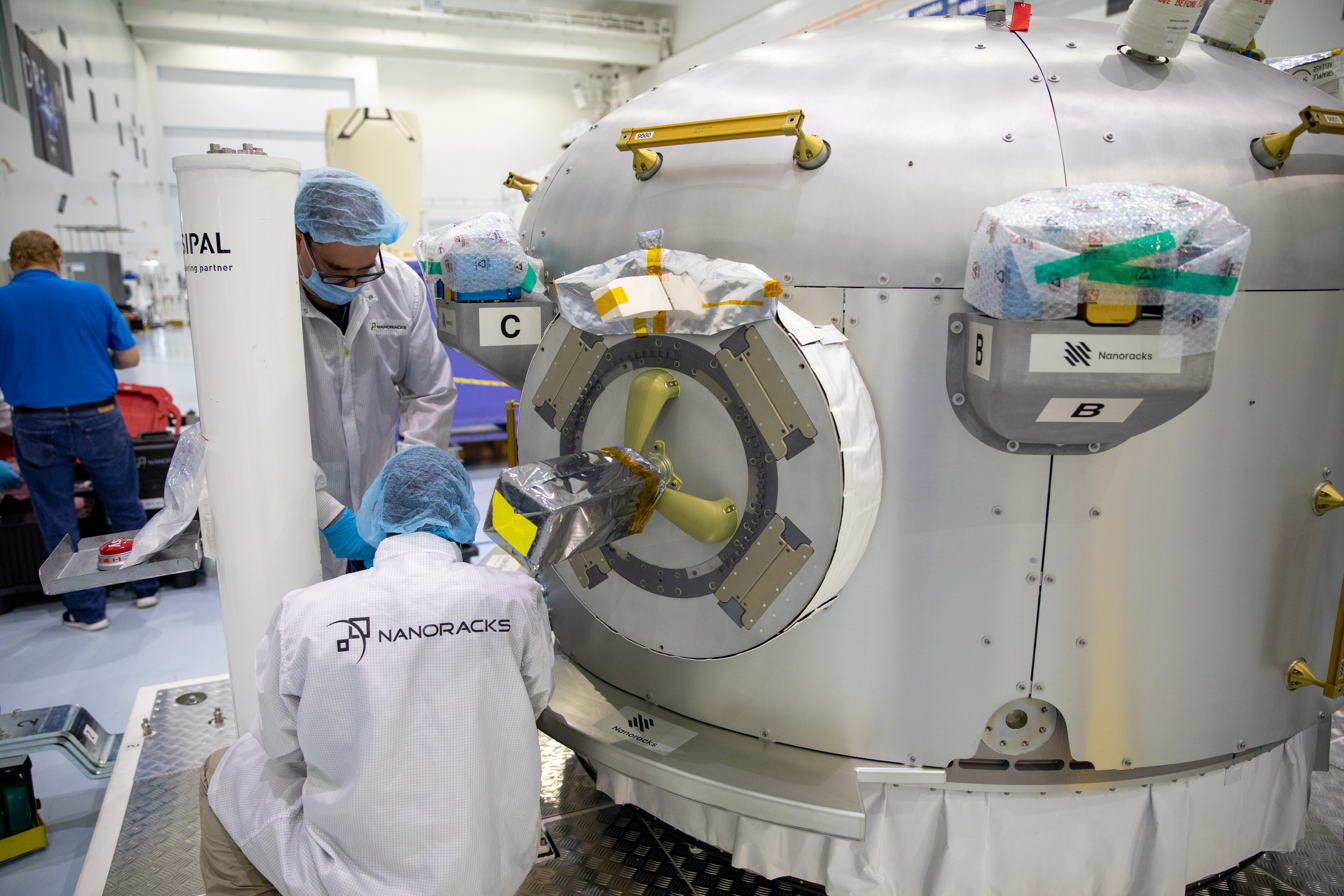
Nanoracks technicians work on the Bishop airlock, which launched on CRS-21

Nanoracks Bishop Airlock, formerly known as Bishop Airlock Module, is a payload airlock attached to the Tranquility module of the ISS, commercially developed and operated by Nanoracks. The Bishop Airlock provides five times the satellite deployment volume previously available, when the Japanese Kibō airlock served that role alone. Nanoracks is the prime contractor, with Thales Alenia Space manufacturing the pressurized shell and Boeing providing the berthing mechanism. It is the second commercial module of the ISS, after the Bigelow Expandable Activity Module (BEAM), which was attached to the ISS in April 2016 and is expected to stay at the ISS until at least 2028. The Bishop Airlock began construction in 2015, and was berthed to Tranquility on 19 December 2020 by the Canadarm2.

=== Experiments ===
BioAsteroid is an experiment designed to test the infrastructure and tools needed for asteroid, lunar, and Martian rock biomining. It will use microorganisms (the bacterium S. desiccabilis and the fungus P. simplicissimum) to extract metals from L-chondrite, testing the possibility to use this technique to obtain resources that will allow long-term and long-distance human space exploration and extraterrestrial settlements.

Hemocue is a test of the system for white blood cell testing on the Moon and Mars. The systems were developed under Earth's gravity, and still need to be tested in zero-g's.

The Brain Organoid experiment is a continuation of the first Brain Organoid experiment. Its goal is to validate the first round of experiments and to continue the research recorded during those first tests. The program studies the early developed human brain, its movements in microgravity, and can help address and create better models of neurodegenerative disorders.

Cardinal Heart is a continuation of a previous experiment. This experiment will study cardiomyocytes in human heart tissue and its reaction to a zero-g environment. NASA Astronaut Kate Rubins was present for the experiment on station a few years ago, and she said that, paraphrased, few things on station make her gasp, but this is one thing that does.

Subsa-Brains studies the effects of micrometeorites and space junk and the damage they can cause, as well as the process to repair the tissue, called brazing, and if it still works in a zero-gravity environment.

Three-Dimensional Microbial Monitoring (3DMM) is a project that aims to construct a three-dimensional map of bacteria and metabolites that are present at various locations throughout the ISS, and determine how the spaceflight environment affects the various species identified.

Monoclonal Crystal Research in Microgravity (MCRM) is a protein crystallization experiment by the American pharmaceutical company Bristol Myers Squibb. NASA astronauts will study the crystallization of monoclonal antibodies in space, with the aim of improving drug formulation and delivery for patients on Earth. Monoclonal antibodies are lab-created proteins designed to interact with specific targets, called antigens. Monoclonal antibodies are used in the treatment of numerous diseases, including cancer.

Rodent Research-23 will study the effects of spaceflight on the eyes, specifically on the structure and function of the arteries, veins, and lymphatic vessels that are needed to maintain vision.

Student Spaceflight Experiments Program: The Student Spaceflight Experiments Program (SSEP) has 27 experiments manifested as part of Mission 14A.

The CRS-21 pressurized capsule carries a variety of other research including studies on how space conditions affect the interaction between microbes and minerals.

=== Returning hardware ===
Beginning with the CRS-2 contract, NASA reports major hardware (failed or expended hardware for diagnostic assessment, refurbishment, repair, or no longer needed) returning from the International Space Station. The CRS-21 mission returned 2,002 kg (4,414 lb) of cargo to Earth. This cargo included:

Treadmill Data Avionics Unit: Failed avionics unit that supports the treadmill, a critical item returning to the ground following the on-orbit replacement with a working spare.

Carbon Dioxide Removal Assembly (CDRA) Air Selector Valve: Critical degraded valve returning for repair and refurbishment to support the carbon dioxide removal capability on-orbit.

Nitrogen Oxygen Recharge System (NORS) Tank: Depressurized tank capable of flying oxygen or nitrogen, and will be utilized for future on-orbit demand in 2021.

Rodent Research Habitats and Transporters: Live rodents from the Rodent Research-23 mission, along with used habitats and transporters that support future research missions and analysis.

Minus Eighty Laboratory Freezer for ISS (MELFI) Electronics Unit: Failed cold stowage item requiring ground repair to enable future cold stowage missions.

Thermal Amine Bulk Water Save Valve: Failed valve that supports efficient usage of the Thermal Amine system returning to ground for repair. The returned valve is intended to help inform robustness of a similar valve design on the Orion spacecraft.

== Gallery ==
SpaceX CRS-21
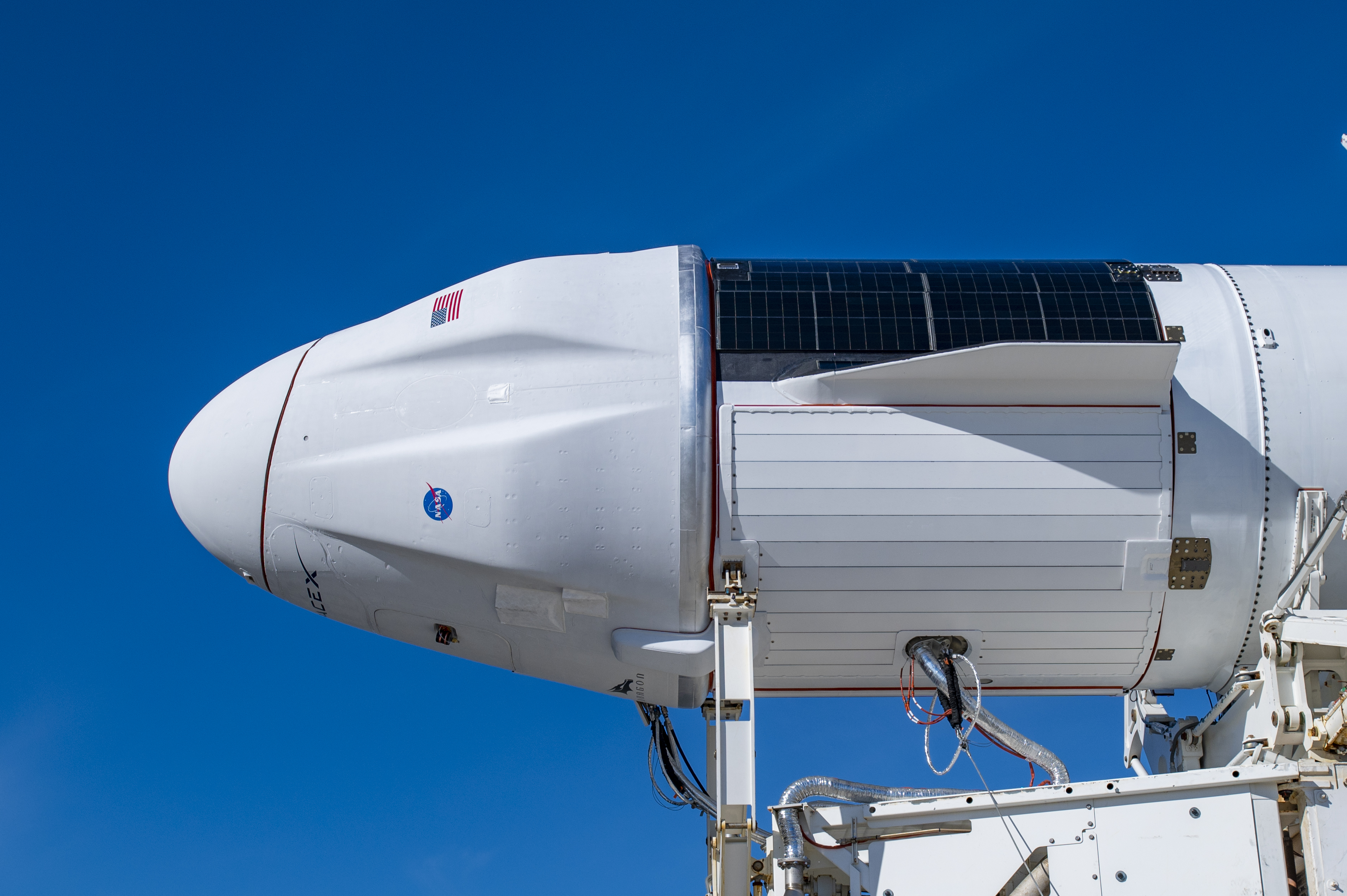
CRS-21 Cargo Dragon rolling out

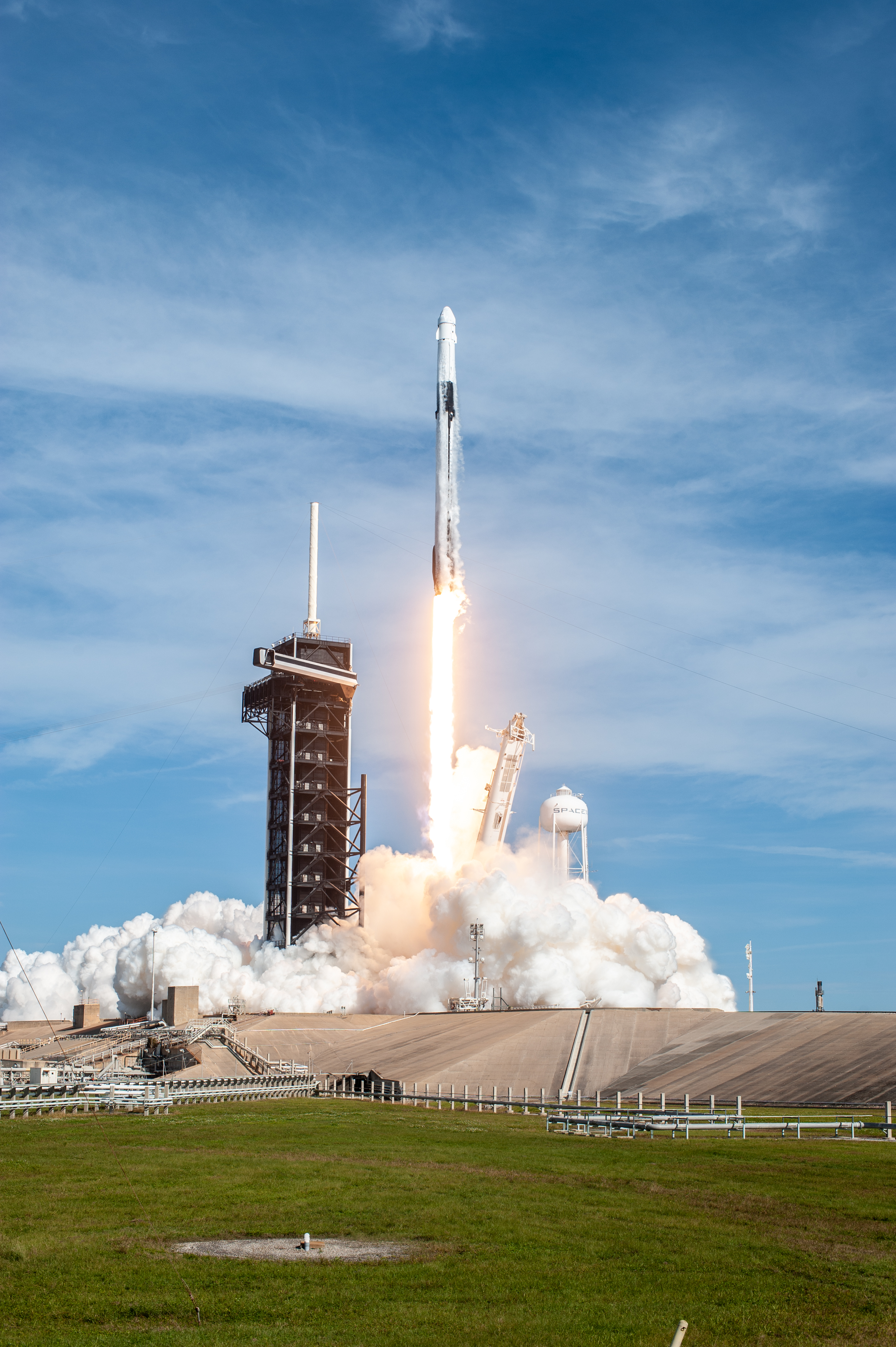
Launch of CRS-21

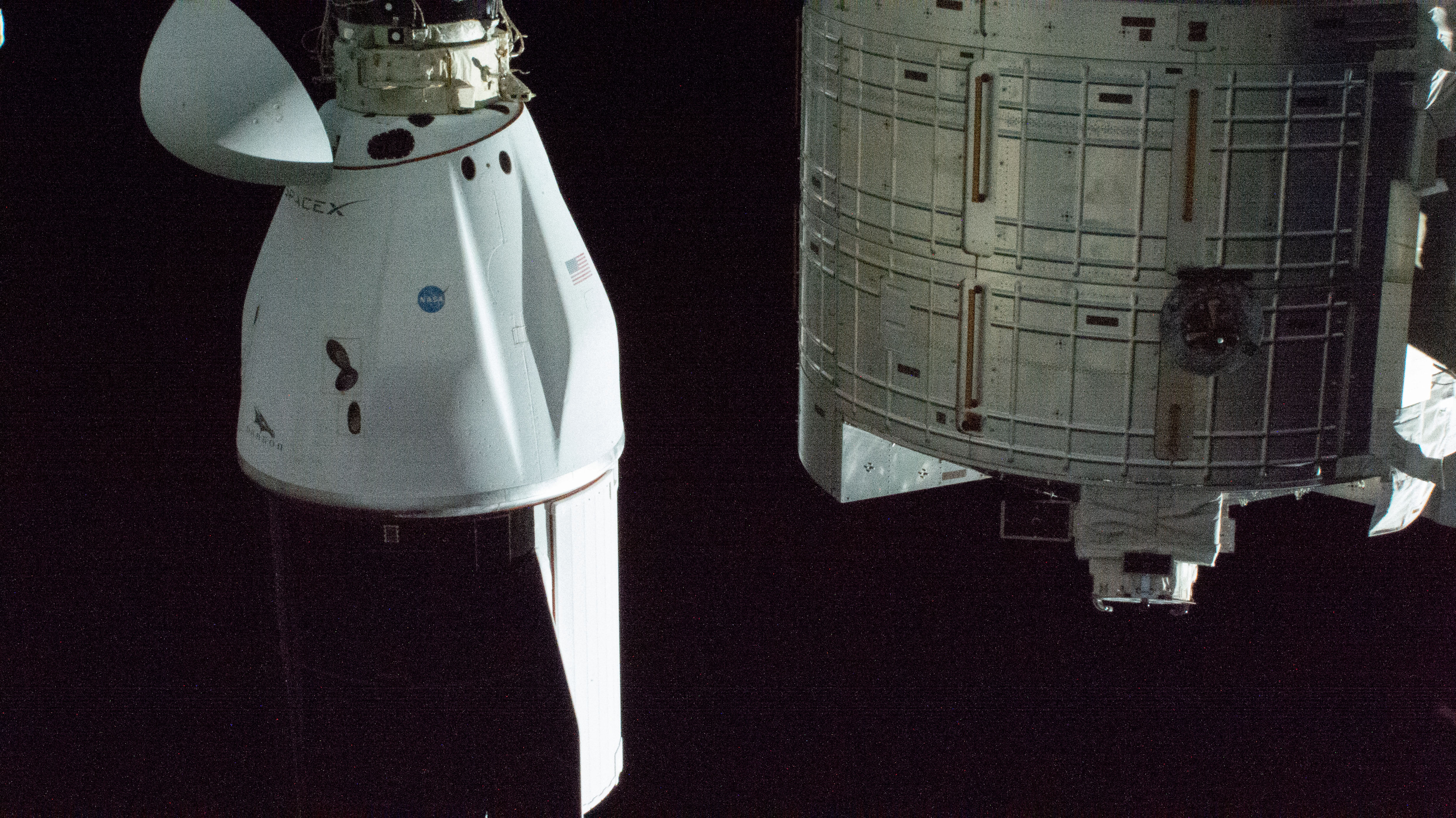
Cargo Dragon docked to the ISS

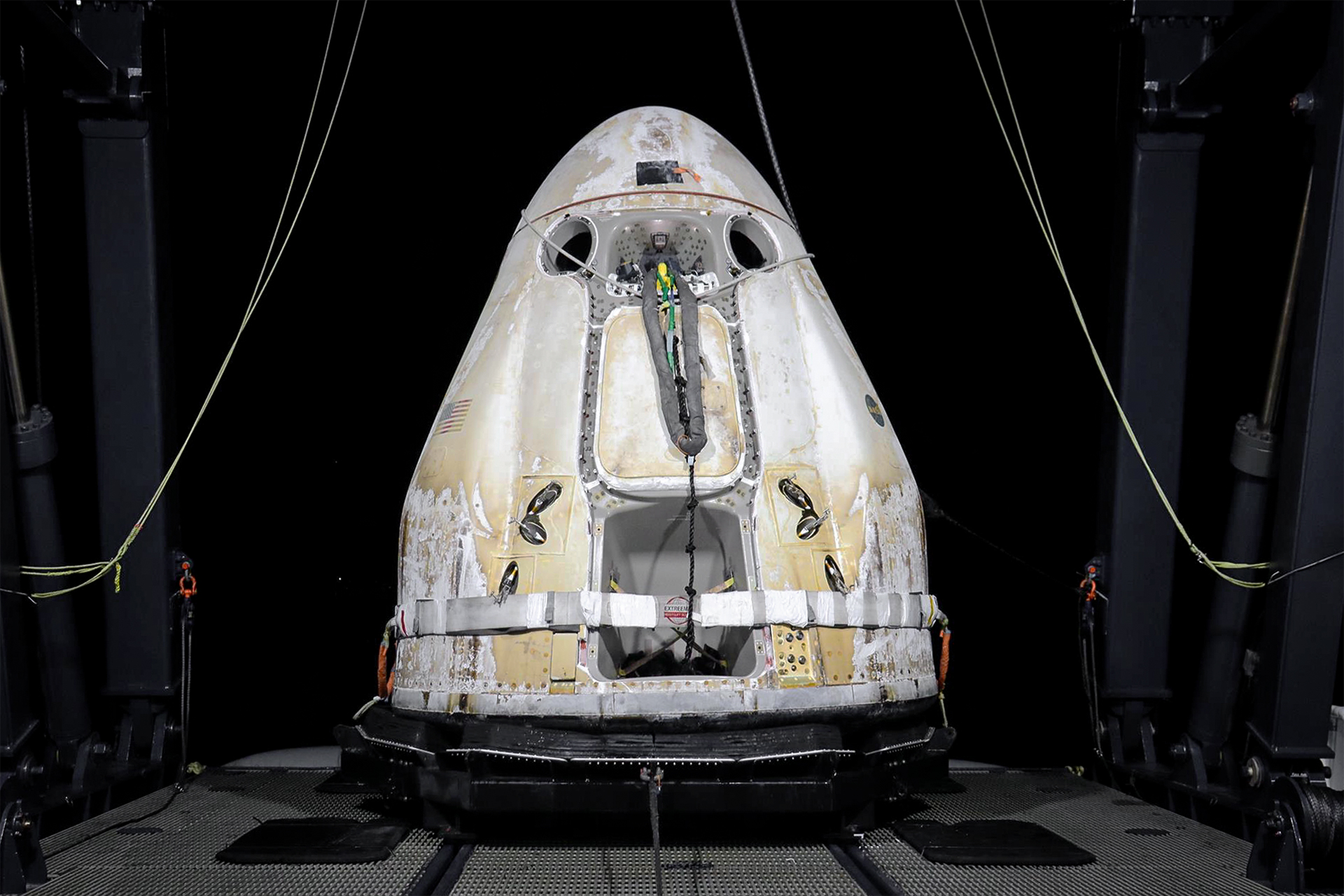
Cargo Dragon after reentry and splashdown

== See also ==
- Uncrewed spaceflights to the International Space Station
