= Fluorescence intensity decay shape microscopy =

Within the scientific study of a molecule's color, Fluorescence intensity decay shape microscopy (FIDSAM) is a fluorescence microscope technique, which utilizes the time evolution of fluorescence emission after a pulsed excitation to analyse the decay statistics of an excited chromophore. The main application of FIDSAM is the discrimination of unspecific autofluorescent background signal from the target signal of a dedicated chromophore.

== Principle ==
The FIDSAM method analyses the number of different molecules contributing to a measured fluorescence signal. Assuming a pure fluorescent dye solution in an isotropic surrounding, the individual emitters are indistinguishable. Accordingly, they obey the same fluorescence emission statistics and the time evolution of the fluorescence emission after a pulsed excitation can be described by a monoexponential decay function according to:

$$F(t) = A e^{-t/\tau}$$

with $A$ = the initial fluorescence intensity after the excitation and $\tau$ = the decay constant (fluorescence lifetime).

In contrast, autofluorescent background consists of a multitude of individual emitters, which obey individual emission statistics. Accordingly, the time evolution samples a summation of numerous individual decay statistics and can be written as:

$$F(t) = \sum(A_1e^{-t/\tau_1})$$.

The FIDSAM technique bases on a time correlated single photon counting (TCSPC) measurement and analyses the degree of deviation of a recorded fluorescence decay from a monoexponential behavior. This is achieved by fitting the recorded fluorescence intensity decay by a monoexponential decay function convoluted with the instrument response function. In a next step, the error value of the fitting procedure, $\chi^2$, is extracted and its inverse value is multiplied with the original intensity value. This way, fluorescence signal, which originates from autofluorescence background and therefore exhibits increased error-values, is divided by a relatively large number, whereas fluorescence signal from target molecules exhibits small error-values around unity is divided by a small number and remains largely unaffected.

== FIDSAM imaging ==
Typically, the FIDSAM technique is applied to a microscopy imaging. Whereas the measurement protocol equals fluorescence lifetime imaging microscopy (FLIM), the read-out parameter is different. In FLIM, the characteristic decay constant is derived, while FIDSAM analyses the shape of the fluorescence intensity decay via the error value. Due to this, FIDSAM is intrinsically not dependent on fluctuations of the fluorescence lifetime, which often occur due to the individual chemical surround of a chromophore, but on analysis of the isotropy of the contributing emitters in a given sample volume.
