= Nanoracks =

American private space hardware and services company

- Industry: Aerospace
- Founded: 2009; 17 years ago
- Founder: Jeffrey Manber
- Headquarters: Houston, Texas, United States
- Number of locations: 5 (4 are terrestrial, 1 is lab space on ISS in low-Earth orbit)
- Key people: Jeffrey Manber and Charles Miller
- Services: In-space services; Small satellite launch services; CubeSat launch services; Microgravity payload integration
- Number of employees: More than 100
- Website: nanoracks.com

Nanoracks LLC is an American private in-space services company which builds space hardware and in-space repurposing tools. The company also facilitates experiments and launches of CubeSats to Low Earth Orbit.

Nanoracks's main office is in Houston, Texas. The business development office is in Washington, D.C., and additional offices are located in Abu Dhabi, United Arab Emirates (UAE) and Turin, Italy.[6][7] Nanoracks provides tools, hardware and services that allow other companies, organizations and governments to conduct research and other projects in space.

Nanoracks currently helps facilitate science on the International Space Station in multiple ways and built the Bishop Airlock to launch payloads from the International Space Station.

As part of a Series A funding round, XO Markets Holdings Inc. was formed as a holding company for NanoRacks, LLC. As of 2021, Nanoracks is the largest subsidiary of X.O. Markets. In May 2021, Voyager Technologies (formerly Voyager Space Holdings) acquired a majority stake in X.O. Markets, becoming the parent company of Nanoracks and positioning the company within a larger space technology portfolio.

== History ==
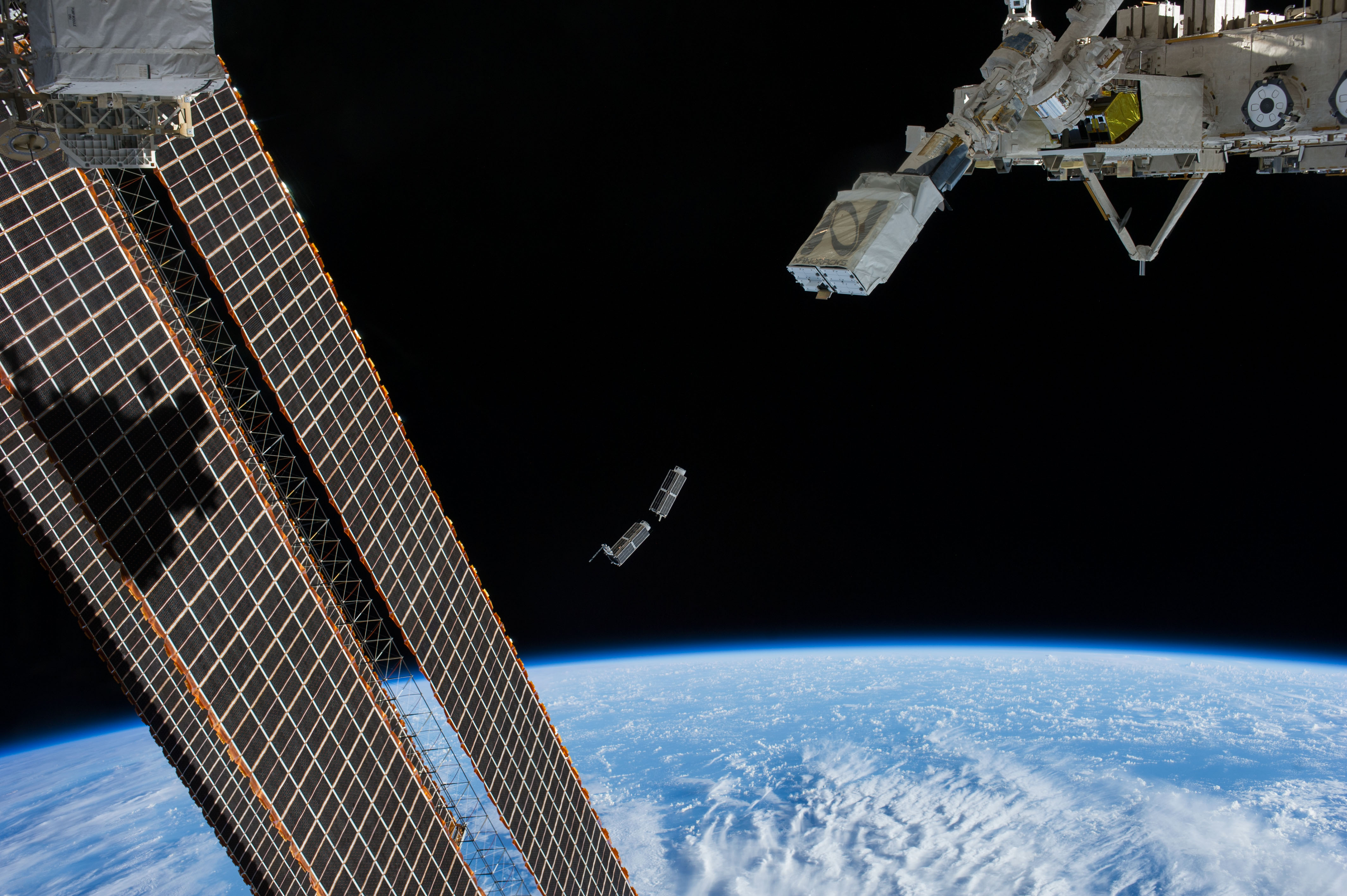
A set of CubeSats is deployed by the Nanoracks CubeSat Deployer attached to the end of the Japanese robotic arm on the International Space Station (25 February 2014).

Nanoracks was founded in 2009 by Jeffrey Manber and Charles Miller to provide commercial hardware and services for the U.S. National Laboratory on board the International Space Station via a Space Act Agreement with NASA. Nanoracks signed their first contract with NASA in September 2009 and had their first laboratory on the Space Station in April 2010.

In August 2012, Nanoracks partnered with Space Florida to host the Space Florida International Space Station (ISS) Research Competition. As part of this program, Nanoracks and DreamUp provide research NanoLab box units to fly payloads to the ISS, with scientific research to be conducted on board the U.S. National Laboratory. In October 2013, Nanoracks became the first company to coordinate the deployment of small satellites from the ISS via the airlock in the Japanese Kibō module. This deployment was done using the Japanese Experiment Module (JEM) Small Satellite Orbital Deployer (J-SSOD).

By 2015, Nanoracks had deployed 64 satellites into low Earth orbit, and had 16 satellites on the ISS awaiting deployment, with an order backlog of 99. The company also announced an agreement to fly a Chinese DNA experiment from the Beijing Institute of Technology on the International Space Station. The agreement includes Nanoracks delivering the experiment to the American side of the ISS in a SpaceX Dragon spacecraft and berthing the experiment to Nanoracks' orbiting laboratory facilities, then sending data back to the Chinese researchers. In 2022, Nanoracks became the first company to cut a piece of metal in space.

In December 2020, Voyager Technologies (formerly Voyager Space Holdings) announced its intent to acquire a majority stake in X.O. Markets, the parent company of Nanoracks. The acquisition was completed in May 2021, with Voyager obtaining majority ownership. This strategic move positioned Nanoracks as a key subsidiary within Voyager's growing space technology portfolio.

== Facilities and labs ==
=== Nanoracks Bishop Airlock ===
The Nanoracks Bishop Airlock is a commercially-funded airlock module launched to the International Space Station on SpaceX CRS-21 on 6 December 2020. The module was built by Nanoracks, Thales Alenia Space, and Boeing. It will be used to deploy CubeSats, small satellites, and other external payloads for NASA, Center for the Advancement of Science in Space (CASIS), and other commercial and governmental customers.

=== Internal ISS Services ===
Nanoracks facilities on the International Space Station (ISS) include the Plate Reader-2 – a Molecular Devices SpectraMax M5e modified for space flight and the microgravity environment. This spectrophotometer analyzes samples by shining light (200-1000 nm) either on or through the top or bottom of each sample in the well of a microplate. The Nanoracks Plate Reader-2 can accommodate cuvettes in special microplate holders as well as 6-, 12-, 24-, 48-, 96-, and 384-well microplates. It can operate in absorbance, fluorescence intensity, or fluorescence polarization modes. Laboratory space on the ISS is provided to Nanoracks by NASA under a contractual lease arrangement.

=== External ISS Services ===
Nanoracks deploys small CubeSats into orbit from the ISS through the Nanoracks CubeSat Deployer via the airlock in the Japanese Kibō module, after the satellites are transported to the ISS on a cargo spacecraft. When released, the small satellites are provided a push of about 1 m/s (3.3 ft/s) that begins a slow process of satellite separation from the ISS.

=== External Platform (NREP) ===
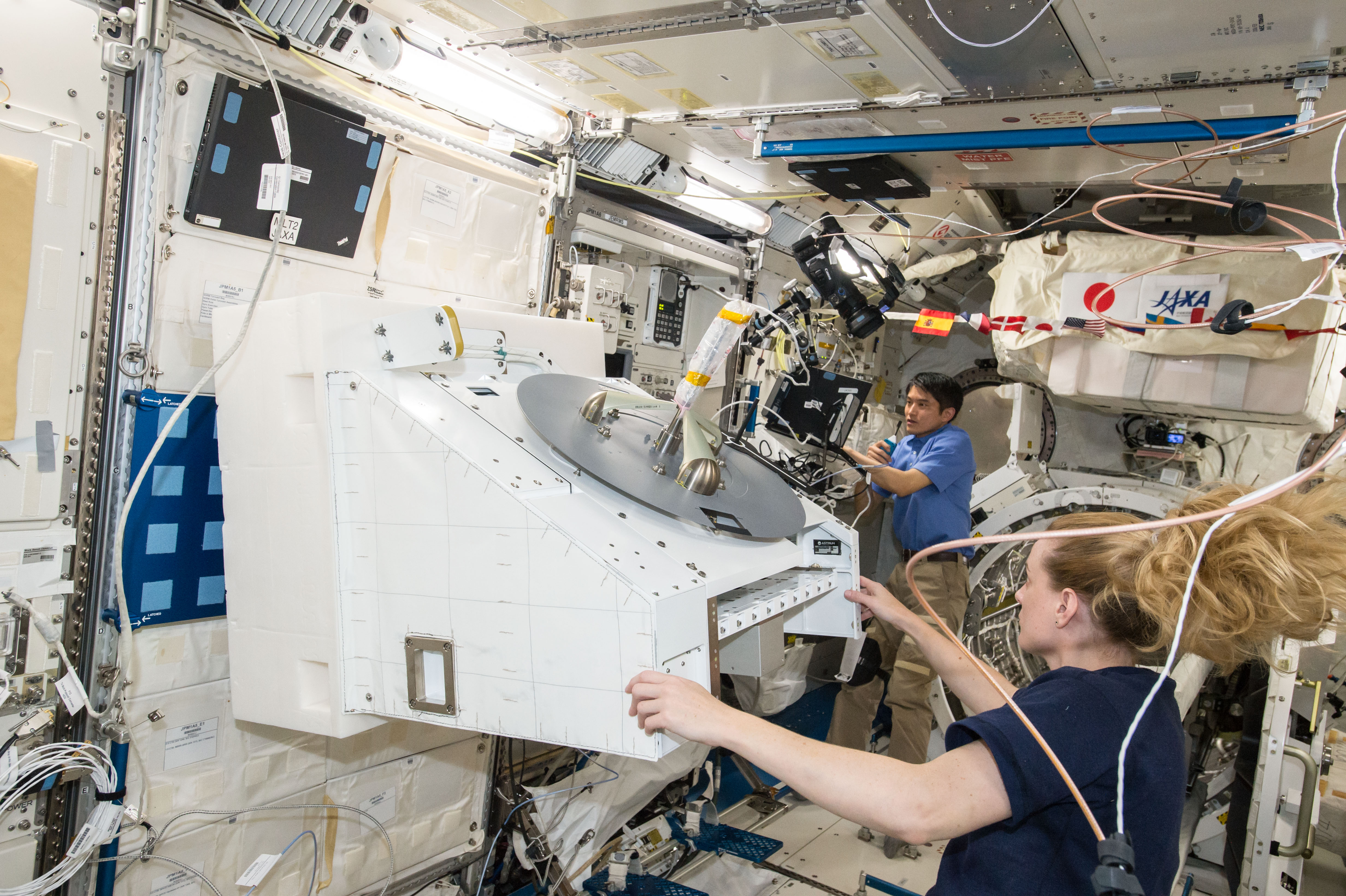
JAXA astronaut Takuya Onishi (background) and NASA astronaut Kathleen Rubins (foreground) prepare the Nanoracks External Platform (NREP) for installation.

The Nanoracks External Platform (NREP), installed in August 2016, is a commercial gateway-and-return to the extreme environment of space. Following the CubeSat form factor, payloads experience the microgravity, radiation and other harsh elements native to the space environment, observe earth, test sensors, materials, and electronics, and can return the payload to Earth.

The Nanoracks Kaber Microsat Deployer is a reusable system that allows the International Space Station to control and command satellite deployments. It can deploy microsatellites up to 82 kg into space. Microsatellites that are compatible with the Kaber Deployer have additional power, volume, and communication resources, which allows for deployments of higher scope and sophistication.

=== External Cygnus Deployer (E-NRCSD) ===
The satellite deployment service enabled satellites to be deployed at an altitude higher than the ISS via a Commercial Resupply Vehicle. These satellites are deployed after the completion of the primary cargo delivery mission and can fly at 500 kilometers above Earth and ca. 100 kilometers above the ISS and extends the life of CubeSats already deployed in low-Earth orbit. The Cygnus Deployer holds a total volume of 36U and adds approximately two years to the lifespan of these satellites.

E-NRCSD missions:

- The Cygnus CRS OA-6 mission was launched 23 March 2016 at 03:05:52 UTC. Inside the Cygnus was the Saffire scientific payload. Mounted outside of the Cygnus was a CubeSat deployer by Nanoracks. Both of these systems remained inactive during the Cygnus docking at the ISS. After the CRS OA-6 resupply mission was completed, and the Cygnus was unberthed from the station and performed scientific experiments. The Saffire's purpose was to study combustion in microgravity, which was done once Cygnus left the ISS. Likewise, in between the CRS OA-6's initiation and its reentry into Earth's atmosphere, numerous Cubesats were deployed into orbit for the commercial entities that built and operate them.
- The Cygnus CRS OA-5 mission was launched 17 October 2016 at 23:45 UTC. On 25 November 2016, during the CRS OA-5 resupply mission, Nanoracks deployed four Spire LEMUR-2 CubeSats from the Cygnus Cargo Vehicle from a 500-kilometer orbit.
- The Cygnus CRS OA-7 mission was launched 18 April 2017 at 15:11:26 UTC. On Cygnus' eighth resupply mission, Nanoracks deployed four Spire LEMUR-2 CubeSats at a nearly 500-kilometer orbit.
- The Cygnus CRS OA-8E mission was launched 12 November 2017, 12:19:51 UTC.
- Cygnus CRS OA-9E mission was launched 21 May 2018, 08:44:06 UTC.

=== Mars Demo-1 ===
Mars Demo-1 (OMD-1) is a self-contained hosted payload platform to demonstrate the robotic cutting of second stage representative tank material on-orbit.

=== Starlab ===
Starlab is a LEO space station jointly developed by Nanoracks, Voyager Technologies and Airbus. It was originally proposed for the Commercial LEO Destinations (CLD) program, and in December of 2021 it was one of three concepts selected to continue their work with grants from NASA, i.e. $160 million. The station is proposed to serve as a weightlessness research laboratory, particularly for the pharmaceutical industry, and the plan is also to have it open to American and European astronauts, but not to space tourism. Initial concept used an inflatable structure for the main habitation area, while a later redesign shifted to a rigid construction (necessitating a larger launcher).

=== Unrealized proposals ===
Ixion was a proposal for a wet workshop extension to the ISS. Initial concept was based on the Centaur rocket stage combined with a "mission module" (providing an airlock and a radial docking port), while later variations (renamed to Outpost) were to use ULA's ACES, depicted with radial docking ports on the side and conformal solar arrays.

The Lightweight Urthecast NanoRacks Alcove (LUNA) was to be a small experimental module built jointly with Urthecast, installed on a docking port on Node 3 currently used by BEAM. It was to provides experimental space for NanoRacks and earth observation instruments for UrtheCast.

== See also ==
- Small satellite
- Orbital ATK
- Orbital Sciences Cygnus
- Soyuz (spacecraft)
- Starlab Space Station
