= Jeffrey Manber =

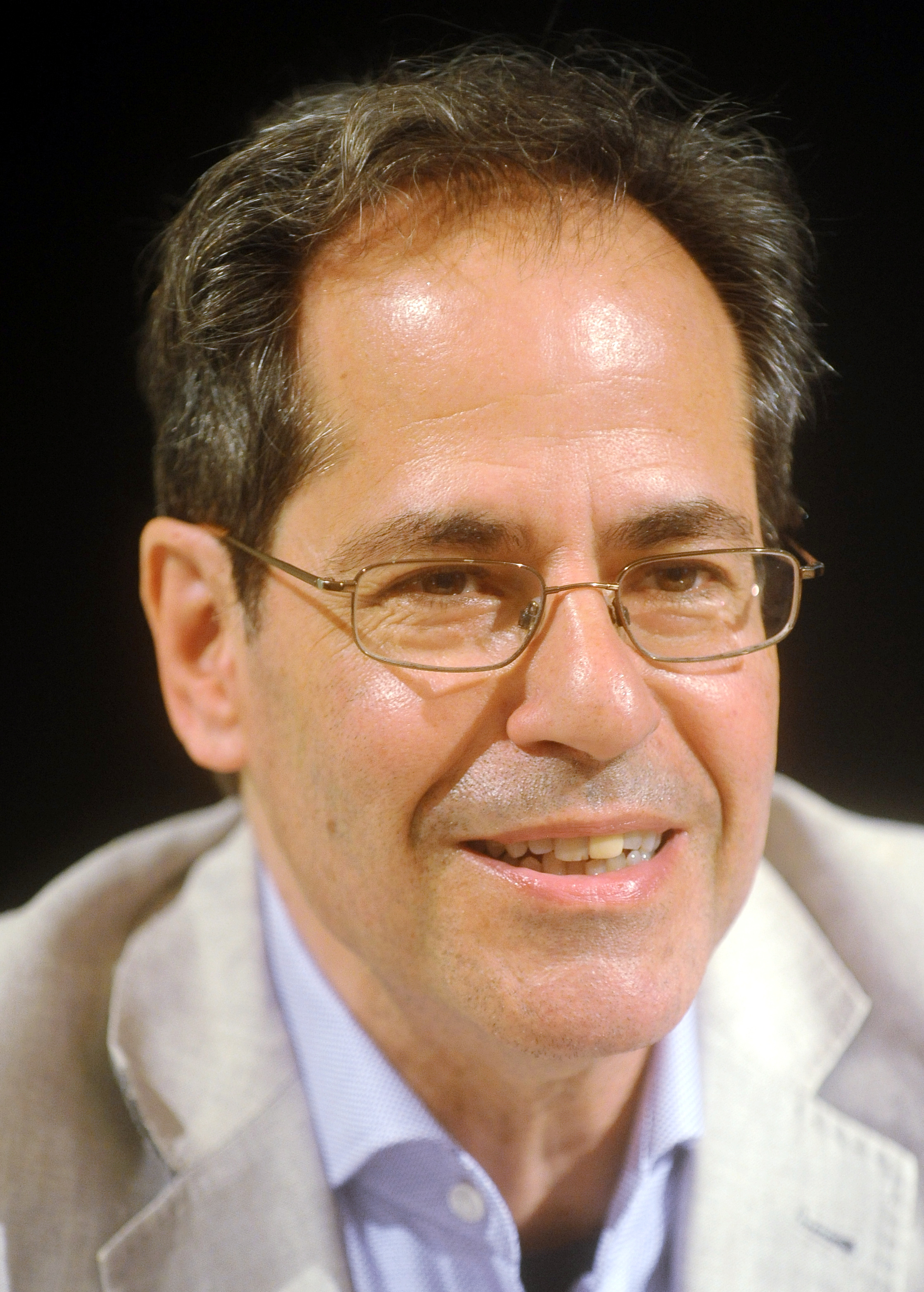
Jeffrey Manber at the Festival of Economics in Trento in 2018

Jeffrey Manber is the CEO of NanoRacks. Manber has been involved in key commercial space projects, principally those revolving around the commercialization of space assets as well as the integration of the Russian space industry into major space programs, including that of the International Space Station. Manber is believed to be the only American to be an official part of the Russian space corporation, RSC Energia, during their privatization period of the 1990s.

As the founding CEO of NanoRacks, and founder of the parent company XO Markets, Manber guided the growth of the first company to own and market its own hardware services on board the International Space Station.

== History ==
Manber's first commercial effort was as the publisher of Moviegoer, a film magazine, and At the Movies, a no-cost, glossy publication distributed in movie theaters throughout the late 1970s. His early interest in space took the form of writing on microgravity business opportunities for publications such as The New York Times, McGraw-Hill, and Town & Country magazine, among others.

=== Early Career and Soviet Space Program ===
This work led him to be invited by the Reagan Administration to help establish the Office of Space Commerce within the U.S. Department of Commerce. In so doing, he became involved in the early efforts by the Soviet Union to privatize and commercialize that nation's space efforts. In 1988 he assisted in the first ever commercial contract between the brand-new Soviet space station Mir and a U.S. company, Boston-based Payload Systems. The highly controversial pharmaceutical research undertaken on this project showed that microgravity was not always conducive to industrial research, despite the claims of NASA at that time. He was invited to the Soviet Union in 1989 to witness the launch, and began working with the Russians and the international banking community to privatize post Soviet space assets.

=== Energia ===
In 1992, Manber became the managing director of Energia Ltd, which represented the Russian space company NPO Energia. His initial task was to help support the first contact between the U.S. space agency NASA and the Russian space program for use of the Soyuz TM crewed spacecraft as a lifeboat for the then-planned space station Freedom. His work with senior NASA officials Arnie Aldrich and Sam Keller helped open the door between the Russian space program and key U.S. aerospace firms, including Lockheed, Boeing and Rockwell Aerospace. His efforts to market the space station Mir played a role in bringing the Russian and American space industries together, ensuring greater safety for astronauts and continuity for the International Space Station project. The payoff in terms of safety took place when the Clinton Administration agreed to raise the orbital inclination of the U.S. space station to allow for flights from the Russian Soyuz and cargo ship Progress, which proved critical after each of the two groundings of the space shuttle program.

=== MirCorp ===
In 1999, Manber was asked by space entrepreneur Walt Anderson and RSC Energia to head MirCorp, which leased the aging space station Mir for two years. Though commercially unsuccessful, it proved the business model that a private company could lease a human space program and generate revenues in a non-traditional manner, as profiled in the documentary film, Orphans of Apollo

History was made in April 2000 when the world's first privately funded crewed mission to orbit was launched. Two cosmonauts, commander Sergei Zalyotin and Alexander Kalery traveled to the dormant space station Mir, opened it up and returned the station to normal life. During the more than 70-day mission, a number of critical firsts were achieved: the first commercially funded space walk, the first space mission without government funding, and the first space explorers to be paid fully by a private company.

==== Commercial record of MirCorp ====
MirCorp concluded a number of ground-breaking agreements. Jeffrey Manber signed Dennis Tito, the first space tourist to pay for his own ticket, to his launch contract. He also signed a contract with television producer Mark Burnett, who produced the Survivor reality television series, and with NBC, to develop a game show that would have sent the winner blasting off for a one-week stay on the Mir. However, due to extreme political pressure from NASA, the space station was de-orbited in March 2001 and MirCorp was shut down.

Later, Manber negotiated an agreement that allowed retailer Radio Shack to film the first commercial shot on the International Space Station, to be shown on American television, which featured a Russian Cosmonaut opening a Father's Day gift.

=== NanoRacks ===
Since 2009, Jeffrey Manber has been the CEO of NanoRacks, the first company to own and market its own hardware and services on board the International Space Station. At NanoRacks, Manber has overseen the deployment of over 300 payloads to the ISS, with 64 satellites deployed to low Earth orbit as of September 2015. The NanoRacks CubeSat Deployer became the first commercial platform to deploy satellites from the ISS in 2014.

== Works ==
In addition to many published articles on space and foreign policy, Manber is the author of the 2009 book, Selling Peace: Inside the Soviet Conspiracy That Transformed the U.S. Space Program, which was published by Apogee Books. He is also the co-author of the 2005 book, Lincoln's Wrath: Fierce Mobs, Brilliant Scoundrels and a President's Mission to Destroy the Press, published by Sourcebooks, which tells the story of media censorship against anti-war newspapers during the time of Abraham Lincoln and the American Civil War.

== Other activities ==
Manber also served as CEO of Yuzoz MSNBC.com, which generates random numbers from live astronomical events, such as solar flares, northern lights and the solar wind, for a variety of commercial products.

== See also ==
- Orphans of Apollo, a 2008 documentary in which he appeared
