= Laser communication in space =

Communication using lasers in outer space

A diagram showing two solar-powered satellites communicating optically in space via lasers.

Laser communication in space is the use of free-space optical communication in outer space. Communication may be fully in space (an inter-satellite laser link) or in a ground-to-satellite or satellite-to-ground application. The main advantage of using laser communications over radio waves is increased bandwidth, enabling the transfer of more data in less time.

In outer space, the communication range of free-space optical communication is currently of the order of hundreds of thousands of kilometers. Laser-based optical communication has been demonstrated between the Earth and Moon and it has the potential to bridge interplanetary distances of millions of kilometers, using optical telescopes as beam expanders.

== Demonstrations and tests ==
=== Before 1990 ===
On 20 January 1968, the television camera of the Surveyor 7 lunar lander successfully detected two argon lasers from Kitt Peak National Observatory in Arizona and Table Mountain Observatory in Wrightwood, California.

=== 1991–2000 ===
In 1992, the Galileo probe proved successful one-way detection of laser light from Earth as two ground-based lasers were seen from 6,000,000 km (3,700,000 mi) by the out-bound probe.

The first successful laser-communication link from space was carried out by Japan in 1995 between the NASDA's ETS-VI GEO satellite and the 1.5 m (4 ft 11 in) National Institute of Information and Communications Technology (NICT)'s optical ground station in Tokyo achieving 1 Mbit/s.

=== 2001–2010 ===
In November 2001, the world's first laser intersatellite link was achieved in space by the European Space Agency (ESA) satellite Artemis, providing an optical data transmission link with the CNES Earth observation satellite SPOT 4. Achieving 50 Mbps across 40,000 km (25,000 mi), the distance of a LEO-GEO link. Since 2005, ARTEMIS has been relaying two-way optical signals from Kirari, the Japanese Optical Inter-orbit Communications Engineering Test Satellite.

In May 2005, a two-way distance record for communication was set by the Mercury laser altimeter instrument aboard the MESSENGER spacecraft. This diode-pumped infrared neodymium laser, designed as a laser altimeter for a Mercury orbit mission, was able to communicate across a distance of 24,000,000 km (15,000,000 mi), as the craft neared Earth on a fly-by.

In 2006, Japan carried out the first LEO-to-ground laser-communication downlink from JAXA's OICETS LEO satellite and NICT's optical ground station.

In 2008, the ESA used laser communication technology designed to transmit 1.8 Gbit/s across 40,000 km (25,000 mi), the distance of a LEO-GEO link. Such a terminal was successfully tested during an in-orbit verification using the German radar satellite TerraSAR-X and the American Near Field Infrared Experiment (NFire) satellite. The two Laser Communication Terminals (LCT) used during these tests were built by the German company Tesat-Spacecom, in cooperation with the German Aerospace Center (DLR).

=== 2011–2020 ===
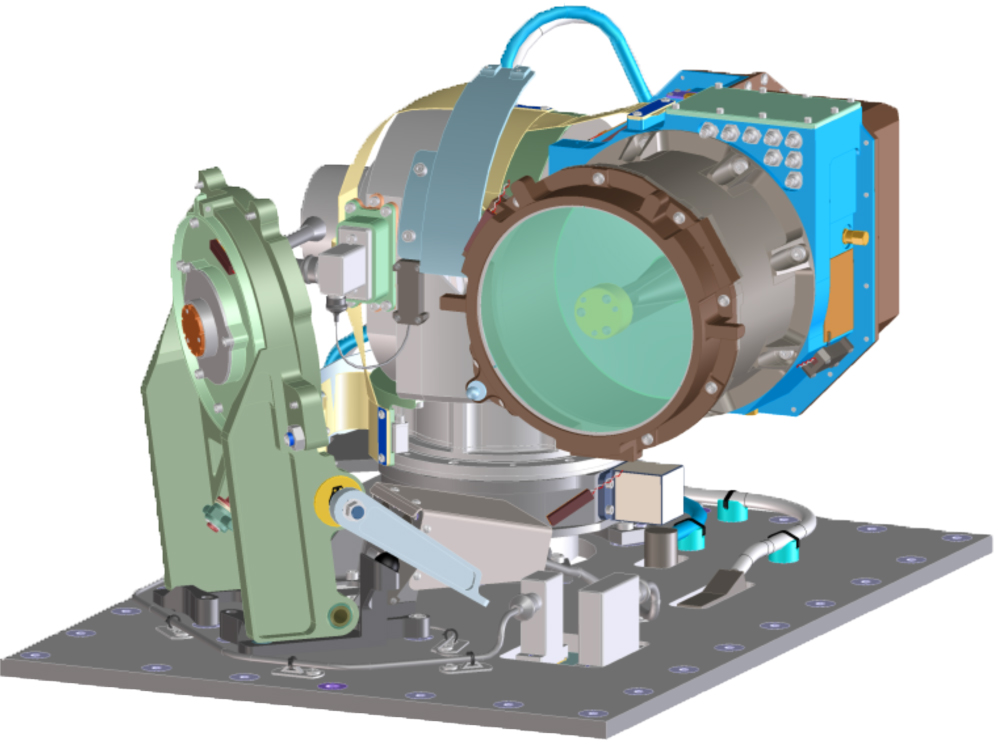
Depiction of the optical module of the LLCD

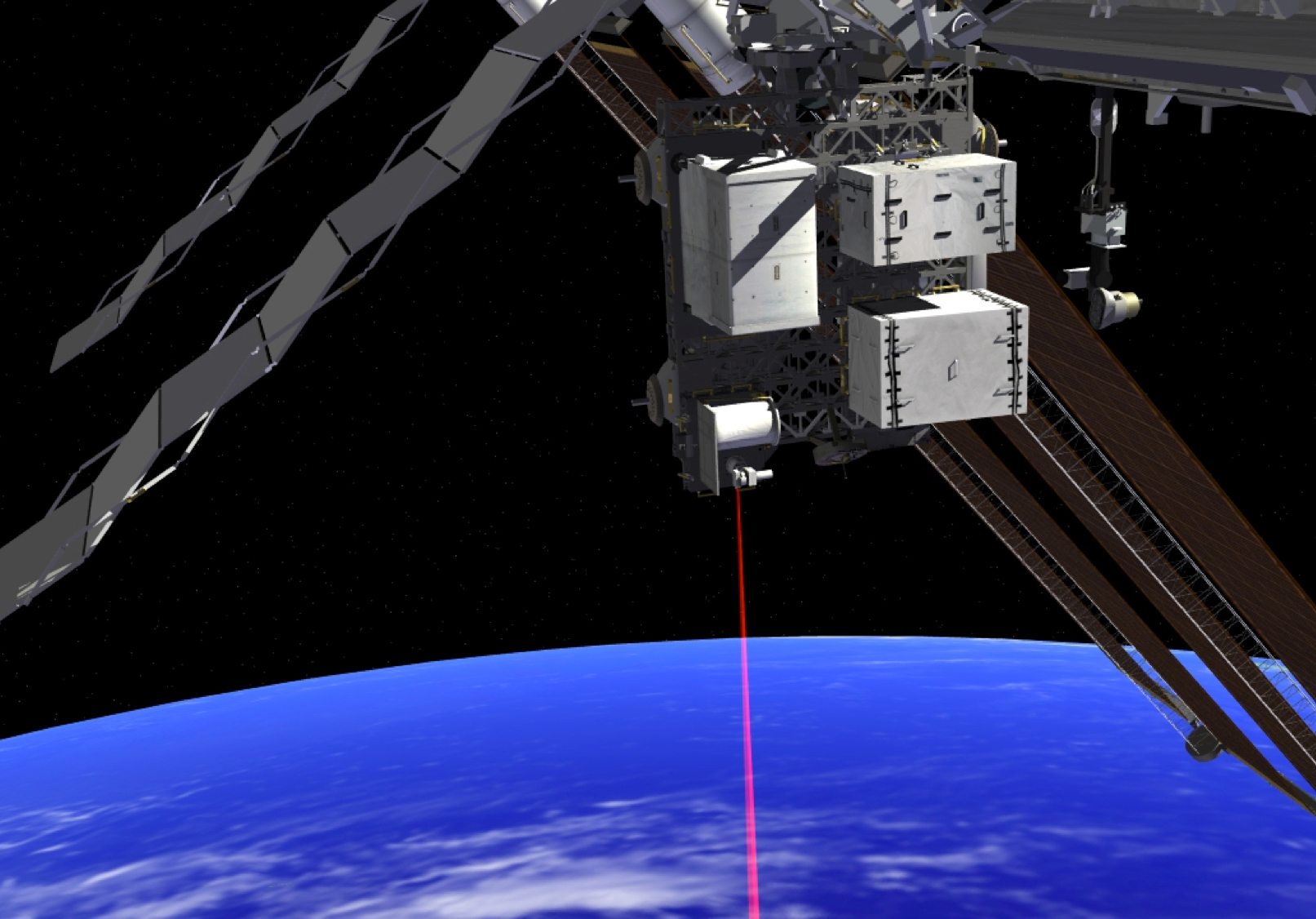
Rendering of the successful OPALS experiment, the invisible laser shown here as a visible beam

In January 2013, NASA used lasers to beam an image of the Mona Lisa to the Lunar Reconnaissance Orbiter (LRO) roughly 390,000 km (240,000 mi) away at night from the Next Generation Satellite Laser Ranging (NGSLR) Station at NASA's Earth-based Goddard Space Flight Center. To compensate for atmospheric interference, an error correction code algorithm similar to that used in CDs was implemented.

In September 2013, a laser communication system was one of four science instruments launched with the NASA LADEE (Lunar Atmosphere and Dust Environment Explorer) mission. After a month-long transit to the Moon and a 40-day spacecraft checkout, daytime laser communications experiments were performed over three months during late 2013 and early 2014. Initial data returned from the Lunar Laser Communication Demonstration (LLCD) equipment on LADEE set a space communication bandwidth record in October 2013 when early tests using a pulsed laser beam to transmit data over the 385,000 km (239,000 mi) between the Moon and Earth passed data at a "record-breaking download rate of 622 megabits per second (Mbps)", and also demonstrated an error-free data upload rate of 20 Mbit/s from an Earth ground station to LADEE in lunar orbit. The LLCD is NASA's first attempt at two-way space communication using an optical laser instead of radio waves, and is expected to lead to operational laser systems on NASA satellites in future years.

In November 2013, laser communication from a jet platform Tornado was successfully demonstrated for the first time. A laser terminal of the German company Mynaric (formerly ViaLight Communications) was used to transmit data at a rate of 1 Gbit/s over a distance of 60 km and at a flight speed of 800 km/h in daylight. Additional challenges in this scenario were the fast flight maneuvers, strong vibrations, and the effects of atmospheric turbulence. The demonstration was financed by EADS Cassidian Germany and performed in cooperation with the German Aerospace Center DLR.

In November 2014, the first ever use of gigabit laser-based communication as part of the European Data Relay System (EDRS) was carried out. Further system and operational service demonstrations were carried out in 2014. Data from the EU Sentinel-1A satellite in LEO was transmitted via an optical link to the ESA-Inmarsat Alphasat in GEO and then relayed to a ground station using a conventional Ka-band downlink. The new system can offer speeds up to 7.2 Gbit/s. The Laser terminal on Alphasat is called TDP-1 and is still regularly used for tests. The first EDRS terminal (EDRS-A) for productive use has been launched as a payload on the Eutelsat EB9B spacecraft and became active in December 2016. It routinely downloads high-volume data from the Sentinel 1A/B and Sentinel 2A/B spacecraft to ground. So far (April 2019) more than 20000 links (11 PBit) have been performed. As of May 2023, EDRS has over one million minutes of communications with more than 50,000 successful inter-satellite links.

In December 2014, NASA's Optical Payload for Lasercomm Science (OPALS) announced a breakthrough in space-to-ground laser communication, downloading at a speed of 400 megabits per second. The system is also able to re-acquire tracking after the signal is lost due to cloud cover. The OPALS experiment was launched on 18 April 2014 to the International Space Station (ISS) to further test the potential for using a laser to transmit data to Earth from space.

The first LEO-to-ground lasercom demonstration using a Japanese microsatellite (SOCRATES) was carried out by NICT in 2014, and the first quantum-limited experiments from space were done by using the same satellite in 2016.

In February 2016, Google X announced to have achieved a stable laser communication connection between two stratospheric balloons over a distance of 100 km (62 mi) as part of Project Loon. The connection was stable over many hours and during day and nighttime and reached a data rate of 155 Mbit/s.

In June 2018, Facebook's Connectivity Lab (related to Facebook Aquila) was reported to have achieved a bidirectional 10 Gbit/s air-to-ground connection in collaboration with Mynaric. The tests were carried out from a conventional Cessna aircraft in 9 km (5.6 mi) distance to the optical ground station. While the test scenario had worse platform vibrations, atmospheric turbulence and angular velocity profiles than a stratospheric target platform the uplink worked flawlessly and achieved 100% throughput at all times. The downlink throughput occasionally dropped to about 96% due to a non-ideal software parameter which was said to be easily fixed.

In April 2020, the Small Optical Link for International Space Station (SOLISS) created by JAXA and Sony Computer Science Laboratories, established bidirectional communication between the ISS and a telescope of the National Institute of Information and Communications Technology of Japan.

On 29 November 2020, Japan launched the inter-satellite optical data relay geostationary orbit satellite with high speed laser communication technology, named LUCAS (Laser Utilizing Communication System).

=== 2021–present ===
First video transmitted via laser from Psyche. Uploaded before launch, the short ultra-high definition video features an orange tabby cat named Taters, the pet of a JPL employee, chasing a laser pointer, with overlaid graphics. The graphics illustrate several features from the tech demo, such as Psyche's orbital path, Palomar's telescope dome, and technical information about the laser and its data bit rate. Tater's heart rate, color, and breed are also on display.

In June 2021, the US Space Development Agency launched two 12U CubeSats to Sun-synchronous orbit to demonstrate laser communication links between the satellites and a remotely controlled MQ-9 Reaper.

On December 7, 2021, NASA's Laser Communications Relay Demonstration (LCRD) launched as part of USAF STP-3, to communicate between geosynchronous orbit and the Earth's surface.

In May 2022, TeraByte InfraRed Delivery (TBIRD) was launched (on PTD-3) and tested 100 Gbit/s comms from 300 mile orbit to California.

Laser communications in deep space will be tested on the Psyche mission to the main-belt asteroid 16 Psyche, launched in 2023. The system is called Deep Space Optical Communications (DSOC), and is expected to increase spacecraft communications performance and efficiency by 10 to 100 times over conventional means. In April 2024, the test was successfully completed with the Psyche spacecraft at a distance of 140 million miles.

In April 2026, the crewed Artemis II mission successfully used a laser communication system known as the Orion Artemis II Optical Communications System (O2O).

=== Future missions ===
Japan's National Institute of Information and Communications Technology (NICT) will demonstrate in 2022 the fastest bidirectional lasercom link between the geosynchronous orbit and the ground at 10 Gbit/s by using the HICALI (High-speed Communication with Advanced Laser Instrument) lasercom terminal on board the ETS-9 (Engineering Test Satellite IX) satellite, as well as the first intersatellite link at the same high speed between a CubeSat in LEO and HICALI in GEO one year later. As of May 2024, a Full Trasceiver type terminal compatible for CubeSat has been designed and in development. CubeSOTA is expected to launch during the Japanese fiscal year 2025 with the terminal for "demonstrating various scenarios, including LEO–ground, LEO–HAPS, and LEO–LEO." CubeSOTA "will be the first in-orbit validation of the terminals."

LunaNet is a NASA and ESA project and proposed data network aiming to provide a “Lunar Internet“ for cis-lunar spacecraft and installations. The specification for the system includes optical communications for links between the Earth and the Moon as well as for links between lunar satellites and the lunar surface.

== Commercial use ==
Corporations like SpaceX, Facebook and Google and a series of startups are currently pursuing various concepts based on laser communication technology. The most promising commercial applications can be found in the interconnection of satellites or high-altitude platforms to build up high-performance optical backbone networks. Other applications include transmitting large amounts of data directly from a satellite, aircraft or unmanned aerial vehicle (UAV) to the ground.

=== Operators ===
Multiple companies and government organizations want to use laser communication in space for satellite constellations in low Earth orbit to provide global high-speed Internet access. Similar concepts are pursued for networks of aircraft and stratospheric platforms.

Project	Project Concept	Environment	Scenario	Data rate	Total number of lasers deployed/anticipated	Supplier	Status
European Data Relay System (EDRS) (Note: EDRS is a Public–private partnership between Airbus and the European Space Agency.)	Data relay to GEO satellites from LEO Earth observation satellites and for intelligence, surveillance and reconnaissance missions	GEO, LEO	Space-to-space	1.8 Gbit/s	7/9	Tesat-Spacecom	Active since 2016
Starlink	Satellite mega-constellation for global telecommunications	LEO	Space-to-space	100 Gbit/s	>1,000/>10,000	SpaceX / Starlink	Active since 2021
DARPA Blackjack	Risk reduction efforts to test the viability of new military space capabilities provided by emerging commercial LEO constellations	LEO	Space-to-space		2/unknown	Mynaric, SA Photonics	Active since 2022
Rassvet	Satellite constellation for global telecommunications	LEO	Space-to-space	10 Gbp/s	>30/900	Bureau 1440	Being deployed, partial user service expected to start in 2027
Amazon Kuiper	Satellite mega-constellation for global telecommunications	LEO	Space-to-space		0/>10,000		Development
SDA Proliferated Warfighter Space Architecture	Proliferated LEO constellation consisting of multiple layers serving needs of the U.S. Department of Defense (DoD).	LEO	Space-to-space	2.5 Gbit/s	0/>1,000	Mynaric, SA Photonics (a CACI subsidiary), Skyloom, Tesat-Spacecom	Development
OneWeb Gen Two	Satellite mega-constellation for global telecommunications	LEO	Space-to-space		0/>1,000		Development
Telesat LEO constellation	Satellite mega-constellation for global telecommunications	LEO	Space-to-space		0/752		Development
Laser Light Communications	Satellite constellation for global telecommunications building an optical backbone network in space	MEO	Space-to-space, Space-to-ground	100 Gbit/s		Ball Aerospace & Technologies	Development
WarpHub InterSat	Inter satellite data relay for LEO Earth observation satellites, space-to-ground communication uses RF.	MEO	Space-to-space	1 Gbit/s			Development
Analytical Space	In-space hybrid RF/optical data relay network for Earth observation satellites	LEO	Space-to-ground				Development
BridgeComm	Direct data downstream from LEO Earth observation satellites to the ground	LEO	Space-to-ground	1 Gbit/s		Surrey Satellite Technology	Development
Cloud Constellation	Secure data storage on satellites and secure intercontinental connections	LEO	Space-to-space			Mynaric	Development
Facebook Aquila	Telecommunications for rural and remote areas provided by a network of high-altitude platforms	Stratosphere	Air-to-air, Air-to-ground	10 Gbit/s		Mynaric	Terminated
LeoSat	Satellite mega-constellation for global telecommunications	LEO	Space-to-space			Thales Alenia Space	Terminated
Google Loon	Telecommunications for rural and remote areas provided by a network of stratospheric balloons	Stratosphere	Air-to-air	0.155 Gbit/s			Terminated
SpaceLink	Data relay services from MEO for LEO satellites	MEO, LEO	Space-to-space			Mynaric	Terminated

Legend
Active
Under development
Terminated

=== Suppliers ===
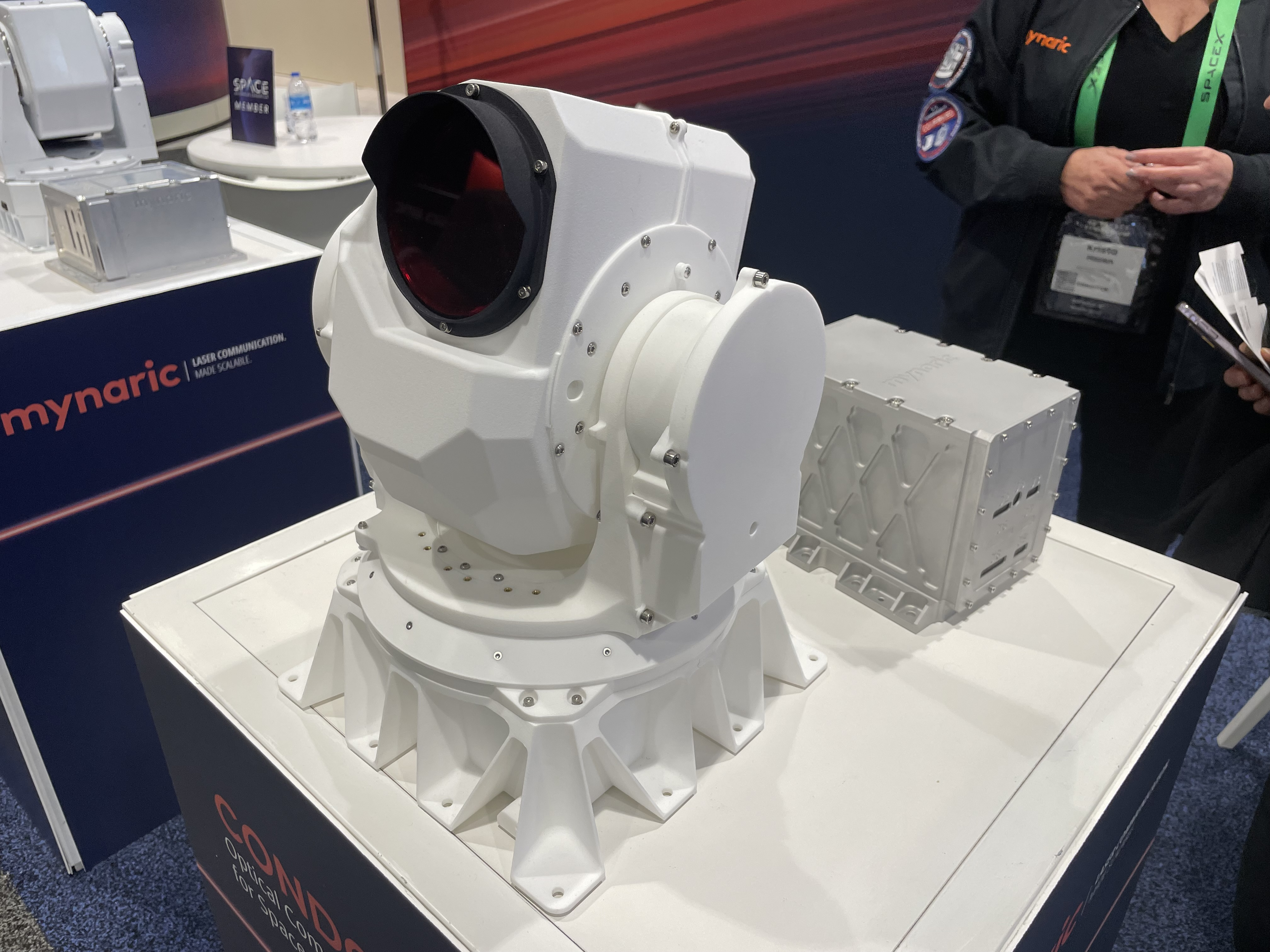
Mynaric optical communication terminal intended for satellite use

A substantial market for laser communication equipment may establish when these projects will be fully realized. New advancements by equipment suppliers is enabling laser communications while reducing the cost. Beam modulation is being refined, as its software, and gimbals. Cooling problems have been addressed and photon detection technology is improving. Currently active notable companies in the market include:

Company	Product status
Ball Aerospace and Honeywell [1]	in development
Ecuadorian Space Agency[2]	in production
Hensoldt [3]	
LGS Innovations	
MBRYONICS [4]	in development
Mostcom JSC [5]	in development
Mynaric [6]
Sony	in development
SpaceX / Starlink	in production
Surrey Satellite Technology	in development
Tesat-Spacecom	in production
Thales Alenia Space	in production
Transcelestial [7]	in development

== Secure communications ==
Secure communications have been proposed using a laser N-slit interferometer where the laser signal takes the form of an interferometric pattern, and any attempt to intercept the signal causes the collapse of the interferometric pattern. This technique uses populations of indistinguishable photons and has been demonstrated to work over propagation distances of practical interest and, in principle, it could be applied over large distances in space.

Assuming available laser technology, and considering the divergence of the interferometric signals, the range for satellite-to-satellite communications has been estimated to be approximately 2,000 km (1,200 mi). These estimates are applicable to an array of satellites orbiting the Earth. For space vehicles or space stations, the range of communications is estimated to increase up to 10,000 km (6,200 mi). This approach to secure space-to-space communications was selected by Laser Focus World as one of the top photonics developments of 2015.

== See also ==
- European Data Relay System – Group of communication satellites
- Lunar Laser Communication Demonstration – NASA laser communication system test in 2013, tested in Oct/Nov 2013
- Laser Communications Relay Demonstration – NASA payload launched in 2021
- Satellite constellation
  - Starlink#v1.5 (operational)
- Mars Laser Communication Demonstration – Upcoming Mars mission
- Optical PAyload for Lasercomm Science – 2014 ISS instrument to test laser downlink (OPALS)
- Deep Space Optical Communications – Spacecraft communication system using lasers
- TBIRD, TeraByte InfraRed Delivery - tested in 2022.
