= Lunar Laser Communication Demonstration =

NASA laser communication system test in 2013

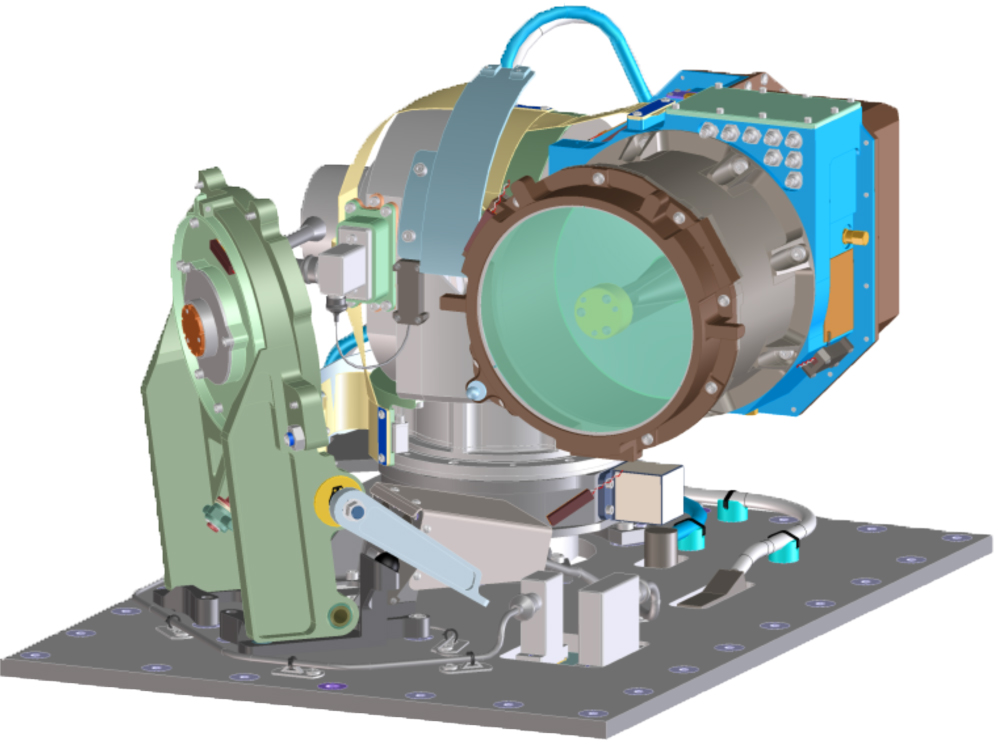
Depiction of the optical module of the LLCD

LADEE's Lunar Laser Communication Demonstration (LLCD) was a payload on NASA's Lunar Atmosphere and Dust Environment Explorer lunar orbiter.

The LLCD pulsed laser system conducted a successful test on October 18, 2013, transmitting data between the spacecraft and its ground station on Earth at a distance of 385,000 kilometres (239,000 mi). This test set a downlink record of 622 megabits per second (Mbps) from spacecraft to ground, and an "error-free data upload rate of 20 Mbps" from ground station to spacecraft. Tests were carried out over a 30-day test period.

The LLCD is a free-space optical communication system. It was NASA's first attempt at two-way space communication using an optical laser instead of radio waves.

It is expected to lead to operational laser systems on future NASA satellites. The next iteration of the concept will be the Laser Communications Relay Demonstration scheduled for 2017. Also, it has been proposed as payload for the Phobos And Deimos & Mars Environment (PADME) orbiter.

== See also ==
- Laser communication in space
