= Laser Communications Relay Demonstration =

NASA payload launched in 2021

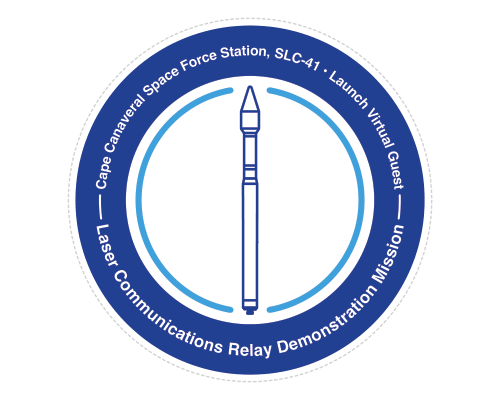

Program overview
- Country: United States
- Organization: NASA
- Purpose: Laser communication in space
- Status: Ongoing

Program history
- Cost: $310 million
- Duration: 2013; 13 years ago–present

The Laser Communications Relay Demonstration (2012 video)

The Laser Communications Relay Demonstration (LCRD) is a NASA mission that will test laser communication in space for extremely long distances, between Earth and geosynchronous orbit.

After being integrated into STPSat-6, a part of STP-3, LCRD launched on 7 December 2021 on an Atlas V 551.

Results from LCRD's first year of experiments in orbit have been shared online and through a SPIE publication.

== Overview ==
The LCRD mission was selected for development in 2011, with a launch on board a commercial satellite scheduled for 2019. The technology demonstration payload will be positioned above the equator, a prime location for line-of-sight to other orbiting satellites and ground stations. Space laser communications technology has the potential to provide 10 to 100 times higher data rates than traditional radio frequency systems for the same mass and power. Alternatively, numerous NASA studies have shown that a laser communications system will use less mass and power than a radio frequency system for the same data rate.

The LCRD mission is managed by NASA's Goddard Space Flight Center (GSFC) and in partnership with NASA's Jet Propulsion Laboratory in Southern California and the Massachusetts Institute of Technology Lincoln Laboratory.

In May 2018, the General Accounting Office (GAO) says there have been delays, funding cuts, and cost overruns but it should be ready to launch by November 2019, as a payload on a U.S. Air Force Space Test Program mission STP-3, on an Atlas V 551.

By April 2020, after further delays and cost overruns, it was expected to launch in January 2021, as a payload on a U.S. Air Force Space Test Program satellite (STPSat 6, part of STP-3 launch). STPSat-6 is destined for an orbit slightly above the geostationary orbit.

== Results ==
Results from LCRD's first year of experiments in orbit have been shared online and through a SPIE publication.

== Precursor mission ==
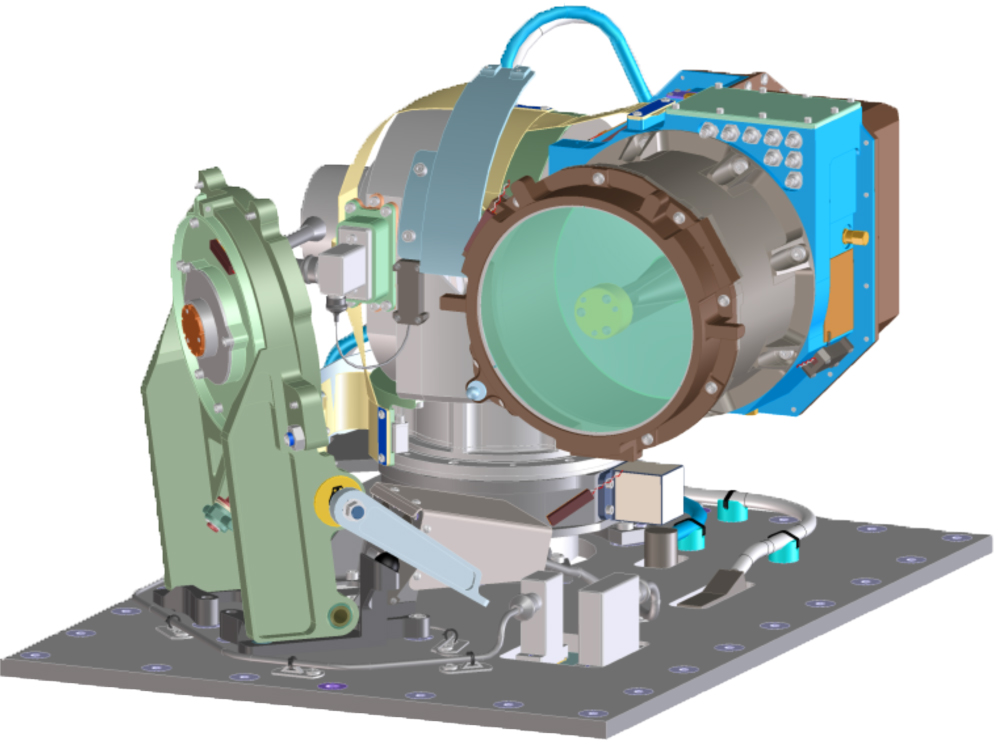
Depiction of the optical module of the LLCD

The concept was first tested in outer space aboard the Lunar Atmosphere and Dust Environment Explorer (LADEE) orbiter in 2013. LADEE's Lunar Laser Communication Demonstration (LLCD) pulsed laser system conducted a successful test on 18 October 2013, transmitting data between the spacecraft and its ground station on Earth at a distance of 385,000 km (239,000 mi). This test set a downlink record of 622 megabits per second from spacecraft to ground, and an "error-free data upload rate of 20 Mbps" from ground station to spacecraft.

== Project purpose ==
The goal of the Laser Communications Relay Demonstration project is to prove the utility of bidirectional optical communications relay services between geosynchronous orbit and Earth. The project supports the advanced communications, navigation, and avionics exploration key focus areas. This effort will prove optical communications technology in an operational setting, providing data rates up to 100 times faster than today's radio frequency-based communication systems. The demonstration will measure and characterize the system performance over a variety of conditions, develop operational procedures, assess applicability for future missions, and provide an on-orbit capability for test and demonstration of standards for optical relay communications. This capability, if successfully demonstrated, could be quickly infused into NASA missions, other Federal agencies, and U.S. satellite manufacturers and operators given the rising demand for bandwidth.

Laser Communications Relay Demonstration will fly as a hosted payload with the U.S. Air Force Space Test Program (STPSat-6). Upon a successful flight demonstration, NASA will provide the communications industry with access to the integrated system to test these new capabilities for commercial applications.

=== ILLUMA-T ===
One of LCRD's first operational users will be the Integrated LCRD Low-Earth Orbit User Modem and Amplifier Terminal (ILLUMA-T), a payload hosted on the International Space Station. The terminal will receive high-resolution science data from experiments and instruments onboard the space station and then transfer this data to LCRD, which will then transmit it to a ground station. After the data arrives on Earth, it will be delivered to mission operation centers and mission scientists. The ILLUMA-T payload was sent to the ISS on SpaceX CRS-29 on 10 November 2023.

The terminal achieved first light, on 5 December, 2023.

== Project parameters ==
LCRD will conduct a minimum two-year flight demonstration to advance optical communications technology toward infusion into Near Earth operational systems while growing the capabilities of industry sources. Objectives include:

- Demonstrating bidirectional optical communications between geosynchronous Earth orbit and Earth;
- Measuring and characterizing the system performance over a variety of conditions;
- Developing operational procedures and assessing applicability for future missions; and
- Providing an on-orbit capability for test and demonstration of standards for optical relay communications.

== Ground stations ==
LCRD will use two ground stations, Optical Ground Station (OGS)-1 and -2, at Table Mountain, California, and Haleakalā, Hawaii.

== See also ==
- Laser space communication
- European Data Relay System, optical links, since 2016
- Lunar Laser Communication Demonstration (LLCD) equipment on LADEE, 2013.
- Mars Telecommunications Orbiter, cancelled, but would have included laser demo
- OPALS, laser comms test, tested from ISS from 2014
- Deep Space Optical Communications, demo to fly on Psyche spacecraft in 2022
