= Tesat-Spacecom =

Aerospace and communications company

Tesat-Spacecom GmbH & Co.KG
- Type: GmbH & Co KG
- Industry: Aerospace, communications
- Founded: 1949, since 2001 as Tesat-Spacecom
- Headquarters: Backnang, Deutschland
- Area served: Worldwide
- Key people: Thomas Reinartz (CEO); Kerstin Basche (CFO); Ralph Schmid (CPO)
- Operating income: ▲280M EUR (2021)
- Number of employees: 1050 (2021)
- Parent: Airbus Defence and Space
- Website: www.tesat.de

The Tesat-Spacecom GmbH & Co. KG (TESAT) of Backnang, Baden-Württemberg is an independently operating subsidiary of Airbus Defence and Space which develops, produces and tests communication payloads for international satellite manufacturers.

== History ==
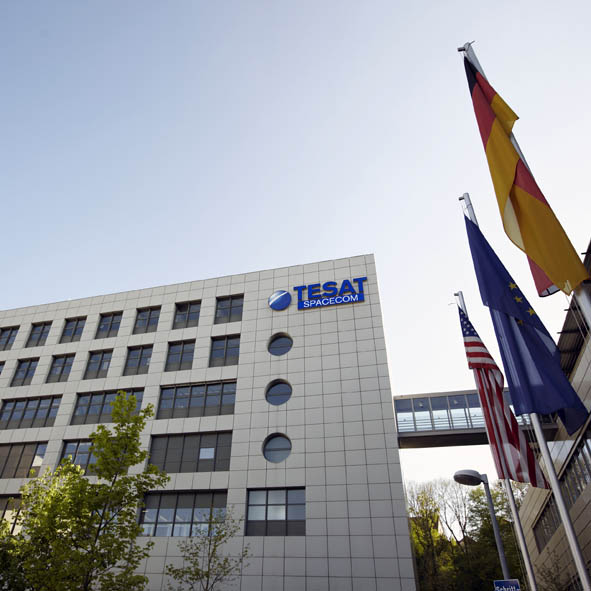
TESAT in Backang

In 1949, the AEG (Allgemeine Elektricitäts Gesellschaft AG) business area telecommunications technology was relocated from Berlin to Backnang.

In 1955, AEG's microwave radio relay division was relocated from Ulm to Backnang, and Telefunken GmbH was founded.

On March 1, 1967, the AEG Telefunken AG was founded with the aerospace specialty and the focus on development, sales, assembly and testing.

In 1971, TESAT was involved in their first space project with the Intelsat IV.

In 1982, the company was transformed into a GmbH, AEG Telefunken Nachrichtentechnik GmbH. AEG-Telefunken continued to hold the majority with 51% of the shareholder shares, 49% went to a consortium of Robert Bosch GmbH, Mannesmann and Allianz.

In 1983, as part of the AEG-Telefunken settlement application, the group's share was withdrawn by the three co-shareholders and divided in the same proportion as the previous shareholder base. The company now operated under the name ANT Nachrichtentechnik GmbH.

In 1989, the company became the main Contractor for Deutsche Telekom Kopernikus Satellites.

In 1995, ANT Nachrichtentechnik GmbH was transferred to Bosch Telecom GmbH. In 2000, the Bosch space product division was transferred to an independent company, Bosch SatCom GmbH.

2001 was the founding year of Tesat-Spacecom GmbH & Co.KG. In November 2001, Bosch SatCom GmbH was renamed Tesat-Spacecom GmbH & Co.KG and was acquired by EADS Astrium GmbH in December 2001. TESAT was expanded to produce intelligence payloads for satellites and remained as an independent company.

In 2006 TESAT was a major Supplier for first Bundeswehr Satellite SAR-Lupe.

In 2007 – First flight of TESAT's laser communication terminal (LCT) on the Near Field Infrared Experiment (NFIRE) (First ISL with TerraSAR-X in 2008).

In 2013, TESAT manufactured its 10,000th EPC.

In 2018, the company celebrated more than 10,000 established Laser links in space.

In February 2022, TESAT announced the intention to establish a manufacturing facility in the United States.

In April 2026, the company's SCOT80 optical communications terminal was launched aboard the GPS satellite GPS III-10 Hedy Lamarr for the first laser communications test from a GPS satellite at medium Earth orbit.

== Finances ==
Year	Revenue in m. EUR€	Net income in m. EUR€	Employees
2010	182.65	7.74	897
2011	208.85	10.00	996
2012	301.29	-13.95	1101
2013	267.11	11.68	1187
2014	331.60	2.61	1150
2015	427.75	50.30	1137
2016	317.08	2.45	1129
2017	218.85	-10.61	1093
2018	245.03	-10.83	1038
2019	263.33	0.01	1020
2020	188.42	-16.98	993

== Products ==
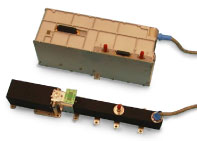
Traveling-wave tube amplifier of TESAT

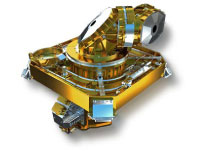
Laser Communication Terminal of TESAT

TESAT's product portfolio ranges from individual components to payloads and complete systems. These are supplied by TESAT to satellite manufacturers worldwide. Among the equipment and systems manufactured for satellite telecommunications are high-power amplifiers such as traveling wave tube amplifiers (TWTA) and their power supplies electronic power conditioner (EPC). TESAT's other product segments include channel amplifiers, filters, multiplexers, modulators, transmitters and TTC transponders.

=== Active products ===
- Microwave Power Module (MPM)
- Solid State Power Amplifier (SSPA)
- Electronic Power Conditioner (EPC)
- Linearized Channel Amplifier (LCAMP)
- Traveling-wave Tube Amplifier (TWTA)
- Multiport Amplifier (MPA)

=== Passive products ===
- Multiplexer & Demultiplexer (IMUX/OMUX)
- Waveguide Switches
- Assemblies

=== Datalink products ===
- Modulators
- Telemetry, Tracking & Command (TT&C) Transponder
- Downlink Transmitters

=== Laser products ===
- Laser communication terminals

=== Services ===
- Manufacturing, testing, engineering
- In-orbit commissioning
- EEE Parts Agency

== See also ==
- Airbus Defence and Space
- Laser communication in space
- Telefunken
