= SpaceX CRS-29 =

2023 American resupply spaceflight to the ISS

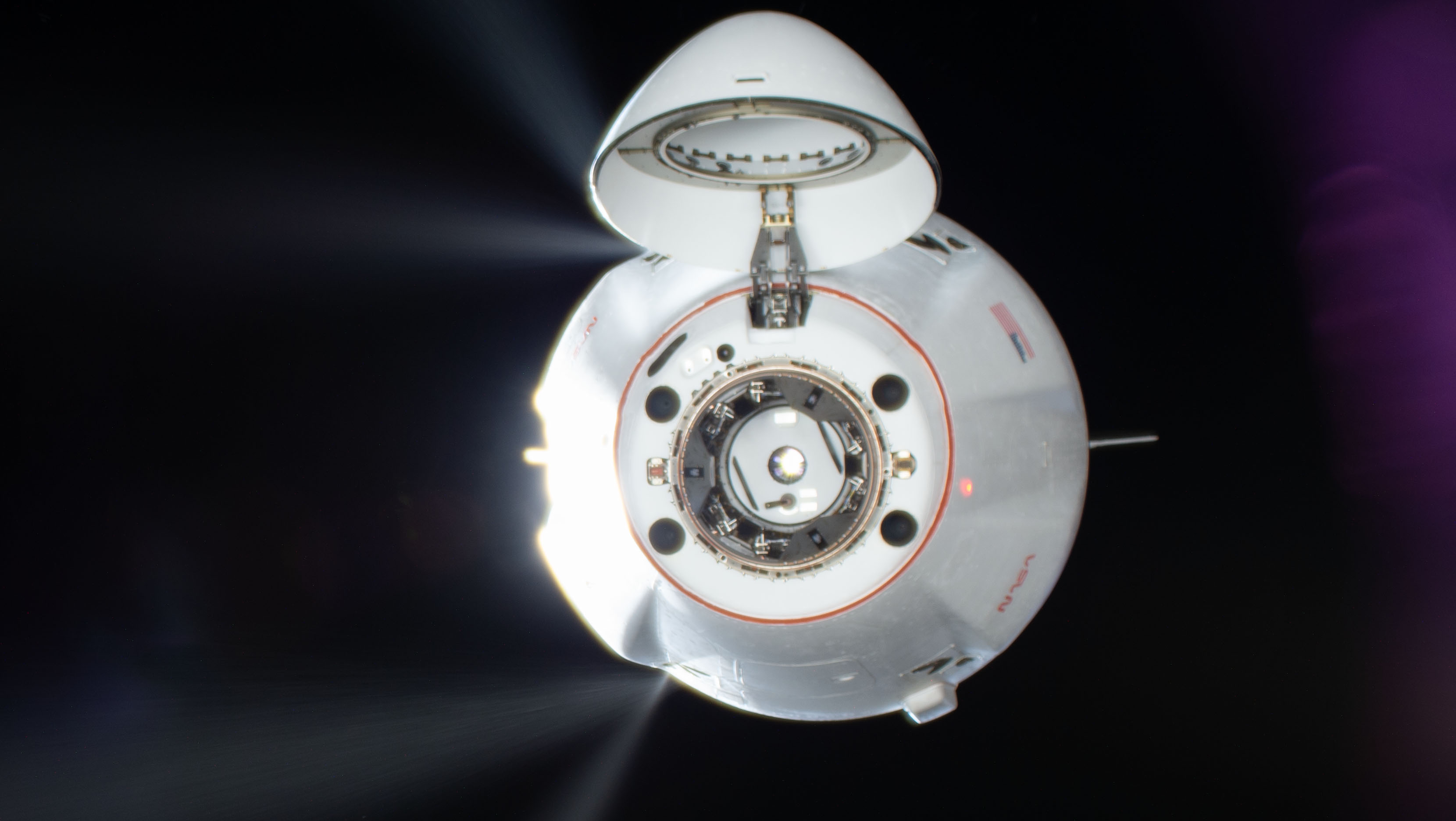
- CRS-29 firing its thrusters as it approaches the ISS
- Names: SpX-29
- Mission type: ISS resupply
- Operator: SpaceX
- COSPAR ID: 2023-173A
- SATCAT no.: 58255
- Mission duration: 42 days, 16 hours, 4 minutes

Spacecraft properties
- Spacecraft: Cargo Dragon C211
- Spacecraft type: Cargo Dragon
- Manufacturer: SpaceX
- Dry mass: 9,525 kg (20,999 lb)

Start of mission
- Launch date: November 10, 2023, 01:28:14 UTC (November 9, 8:28:14 pm EST)
- Rocket: Falcon 9 Block 5 B1081-2
- Launch site: Kennedy, LC‑39A

End of mission
- Recovered by: MV Shannon
- Landing date: December 22, 2023, 17:33 UTC (12:33 pm EST)
- Landing site: Gulf of Mexico, near Tallahassee, Florida (29.3°N 84.2°W)

Orbital parameters
- Reference system: Geocentric orbit
- Regime: Low Earth orbit
- Inclination: 51.66°

Docking with ISS
- Docking port: Harmony forward
- Docking date: November 11, 2023, 10:07 UTC
- Undocking date: December 21, 2023, 22:05 UTC
- Time docked: 40 days, 11 hours, 58 minutes

Cargo
- Mass: 2,950 kg (6,500 lb)
- Pressurised: 2,381 kg (5,249 lb)
- Unpressurised: 569 kg (1,254 lb)
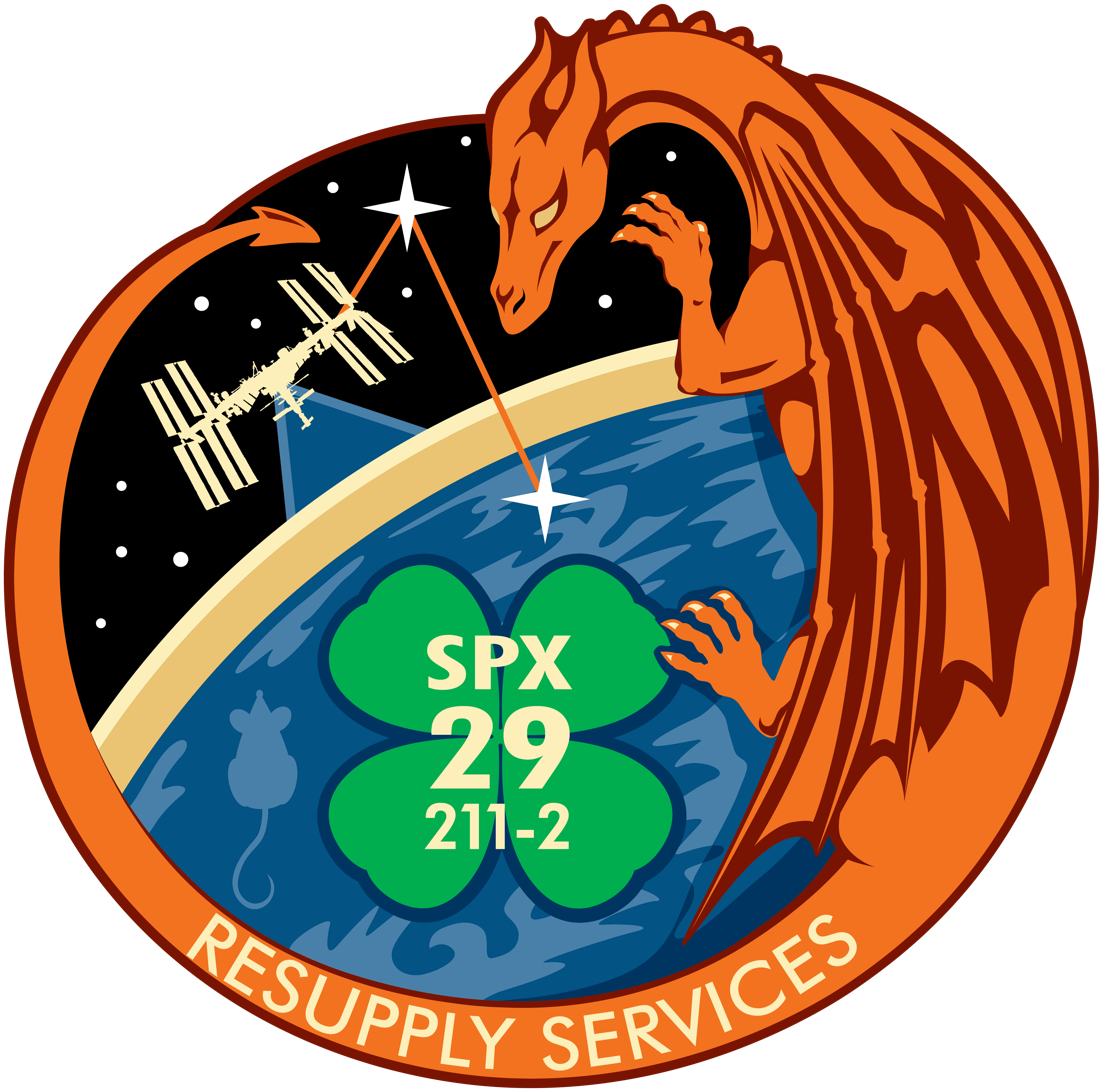
- Mission patch Commercial Resupply Services Cargo Dragon flights

SpaceX CRS-29, also known as SpX-29, is a Commercial Resupply Service mission to the International Space Station (ISS) launched on November 10, 2023. The mission was contracted by NASA and flown by SpaceX using Cargo Dragon C211. It was the ninth flight for SpaceX under NASA's CRS Phase 2.

== Cargo Dragon ==
SpaceX plans to reuse the Cargo Dragons up to five times. The Cargo Dragon will launch without SuperDraco abort engines, without seats, cockpit controls and the life support system required to sustain astronauts in space. Dragon 2 improves on Dragon 1 in several ways, including lessened refurbishment time, leading to shorter periods between flights.

The new Cargo Dragon capsules under the NASA CRS Phase 2 contract will land east of Florida in the Atlantic Ocean.

== Launch ==
NASA and SpaceX originally targeted a window no earlier than 03:01 UTC on Sunday, November 6, 2024, for the launch of the company's 29th commercial resupply services mission to the International Space Station. The date shift takes into account required time for teams to complete pad readiness after the agency's Psyche launch on SpaceX's Falcon Heavy rocket, which lifted off on October 13 from Launch Complex 39A at NASA's Kennedy Space Center. Falcon 9 and the Cargo Dragon spacecraft lifted off on November 10, 2023, at 01:28:14 UTC from Launch Complex 39A. The first stage separated at T+2:21, and Falcon 9 landed at Landing Zone 1 (LZ-1) at T+7:36. The second stage shut down at T+8:33, and the Dragon spacecraft separated from the second stage at T+11:46.

== Manifest ==
The Cargo Dragon spacecraft was loaded with a total of 2,950 kilograms (6,500 lb) of cargo and supplies before its launch, including 2,381 kilograms (5,249 lb) of pressurized and 561 kilograms (1,237 lb) of unpressurized cargo.

The cargo manifest is broken down as follows:

- Crew supplies: 681 kg (1,501 lb)
- Science investigations: 1,012 kg (2,231 lb)
- Spacewalk equipment: 48 kg (106 lb)
- Vehicle hardware: 491 kg (1,082 lb)
- Computer resources: 46 kg (101 lb)

== Research ==
Various experiments were transported to the orbiting laboratory, providing valuable insights for researchers.

The research includes work to understand interactions between weather on Earth and space, and laser communications. NASA's Atmospheric Waves Experiment (AWE) will study atmospheric gravity waves –powerful waves formed by weather disturbances on Earth such as strong thunderstorms or brewing hurricanes – to understand the flow of energy through Earth's upper atmosphere and space. Another experiment – Integrated Laser Communications Relay Demonstration Low-Earth-Orbit User Modem and Amplifier Terminal – (ILLUMA-T) aims to test high data rate laser communications from the space station to Earth. This will complete NASA's first two-way, end-to-end laser relay system by sending high-resolution data to the agency's Laser Communications Relay Demonstration, which launched in December 2021. It will be tested for six months on ISS, before being placed into operational use.

Other investigations that will launch with the resupply mission include ESA's (European Space Agency) Aquamembrane-3, which will test water filtration using proteins found in nature for water recycling and recovery, and Plant Habitat-06, which will evaluate the effects of spaceflight on plant defense responses using multiple genotypes of tomato.

Redwire will be launching microgravity research payloads focused on pharmaceutical drug development and regenerative medicine, including an experiment in bioprinting cardiac tissue.

== Gallery ==
SpaceX CRS-29
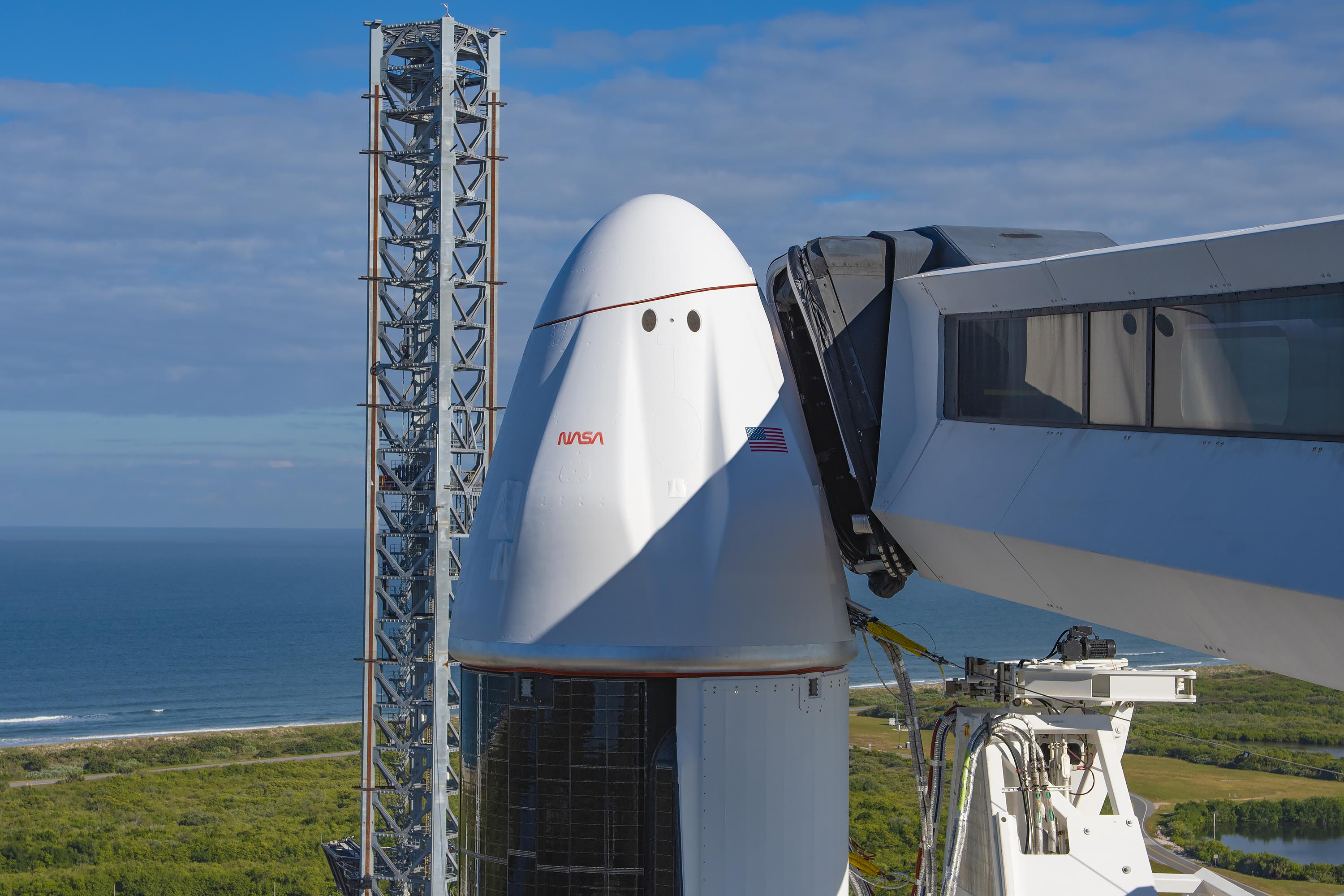
CRS-29 on the pad

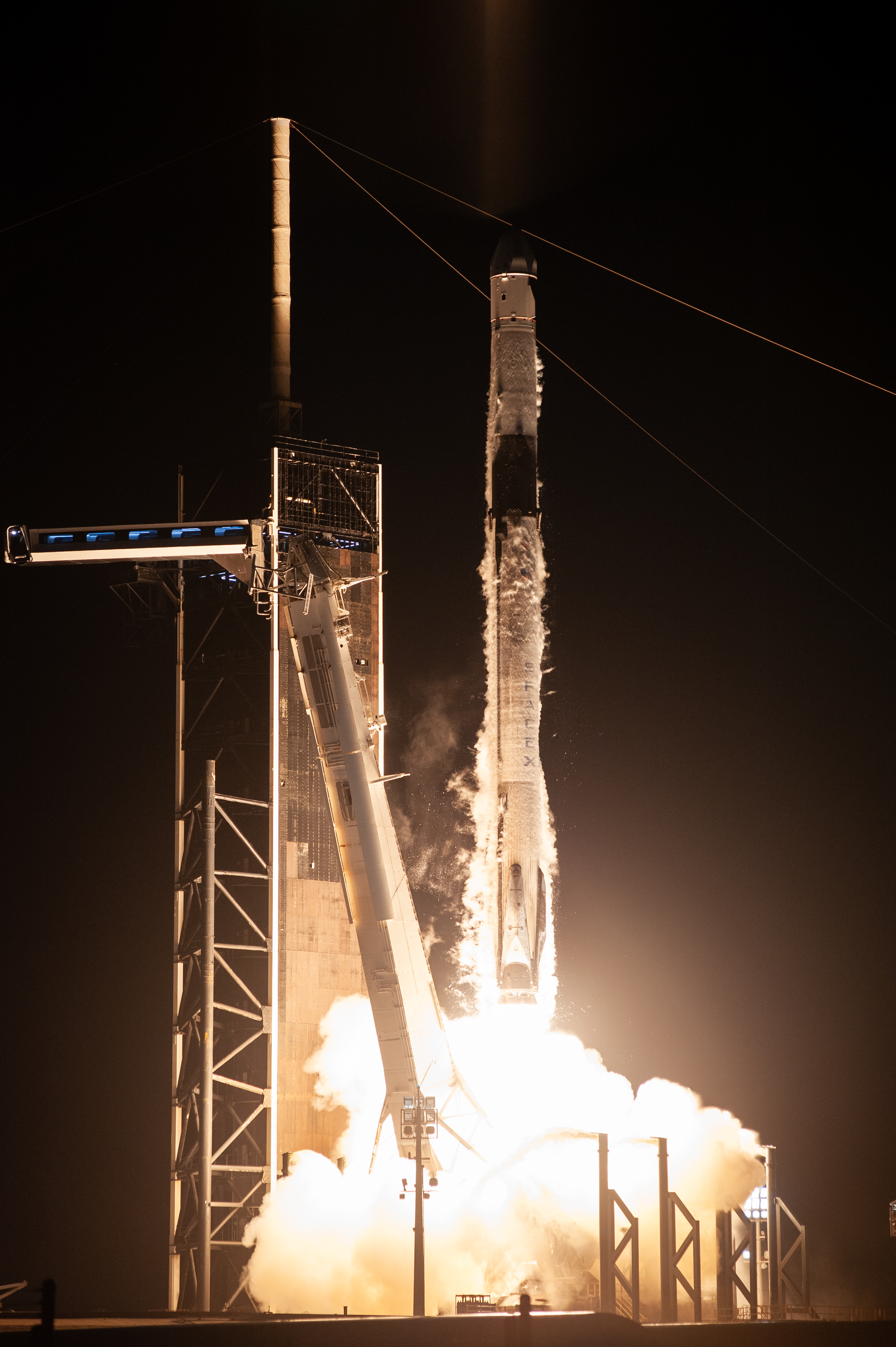
Launch of CRS-29

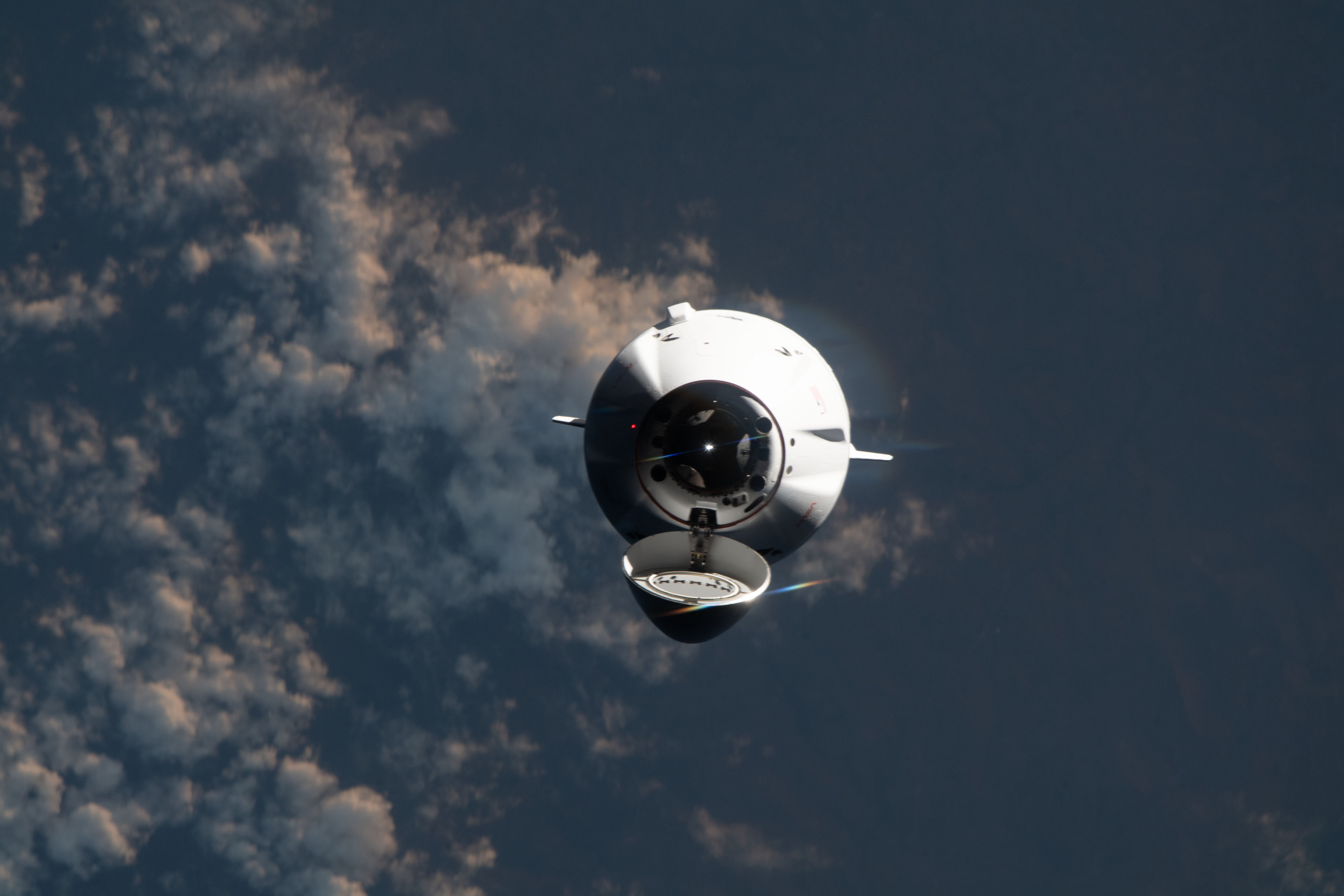
Cargo Dragon approaching the ISS

== See also ==
- Uncrewed spaceflights to the International Space Station
