= LADEE =

Former NASA Lunar mission

Lunar Atmosphere and Dust Environment Explorer
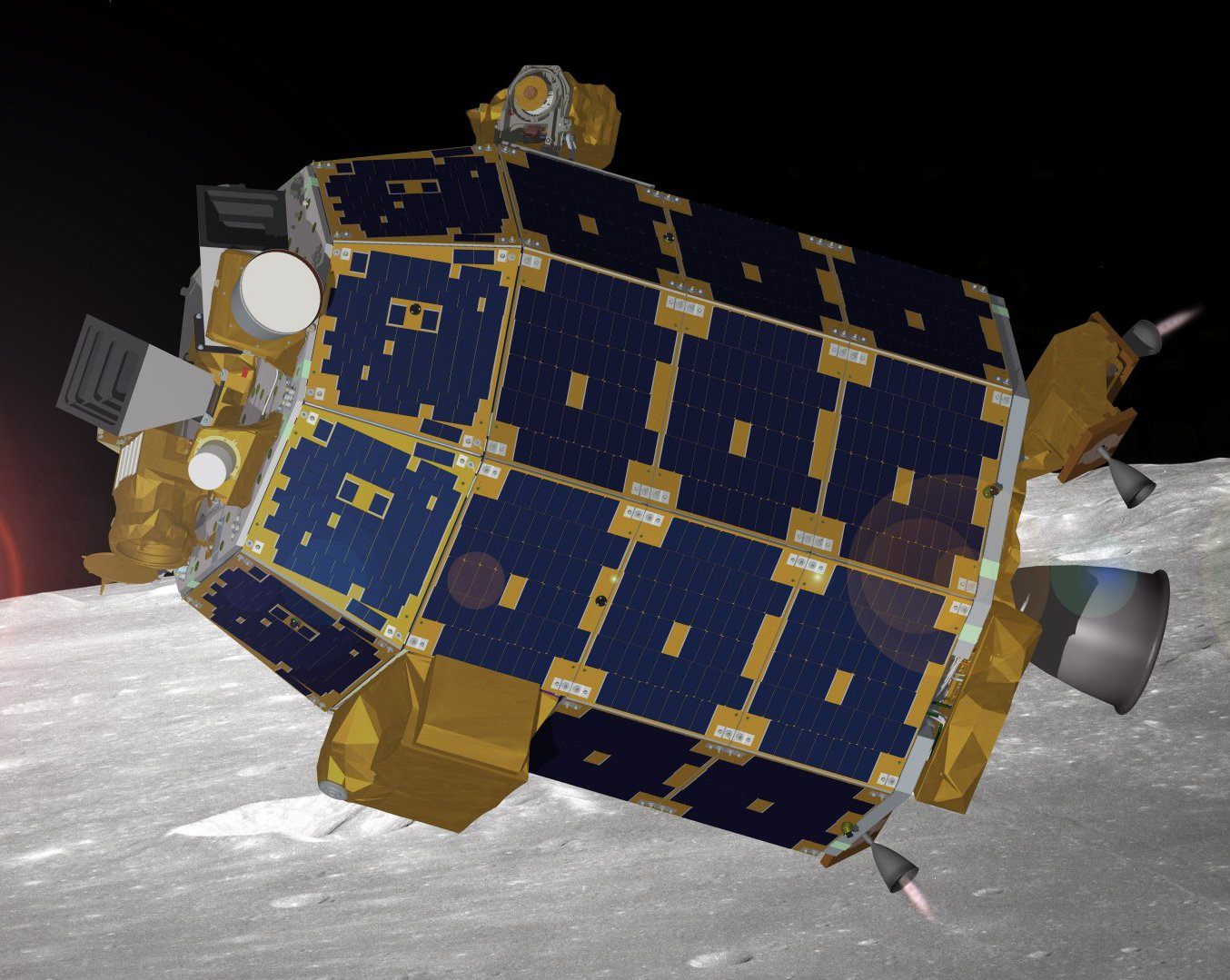
- Artist's depiction of LADEE in lunar orbit
- Mission type: Lunar atmospheric research
- Operator: NASA
- COSPAR ID: 2013-047A
- SATCAT no.: 39246
- Website: nasa.gov/ladee
- Mission duration: Primary mission: 100 days Extended mission: 28 days Total duration: 223 days

Spacecraft properties
- Bus: MCSB
- Manufacturer: Ames Research Center
- Launch mass: 383 kg (844 lb)
- Dry mass: 248.2 kg (547 lb)
- Payload mass: 49.6 kg (109 lb)
- Dimensions: 1.85×1.85×2.37 m (6.1×6.1×7.8 ft)
- Power: 295 watts

Start of mission
- Launch date: September 7, 2013, 03:27 UTC
- Rocket: Minotaur V
- Launch site: Wallops Pad 0B
- Contractor: Orbital

End of mission
- Disposal: Deorbited
- Decay date: April 18, 2014, ~04:30 UTC

Orbital parameters
- Reference system: Selenocentric
- Periselene altitude: 25–50 km (16–31 mi)
- Aposelene altitude: 60–80 km (37–50 mi)
- Inclination: 157 degrees
- Period: 111.5 to 116.5 minutes
- Epoch: Planned (science phase)

Moon orbiter
- Orbital insertion: October 6, 2013, 10:57 UTC
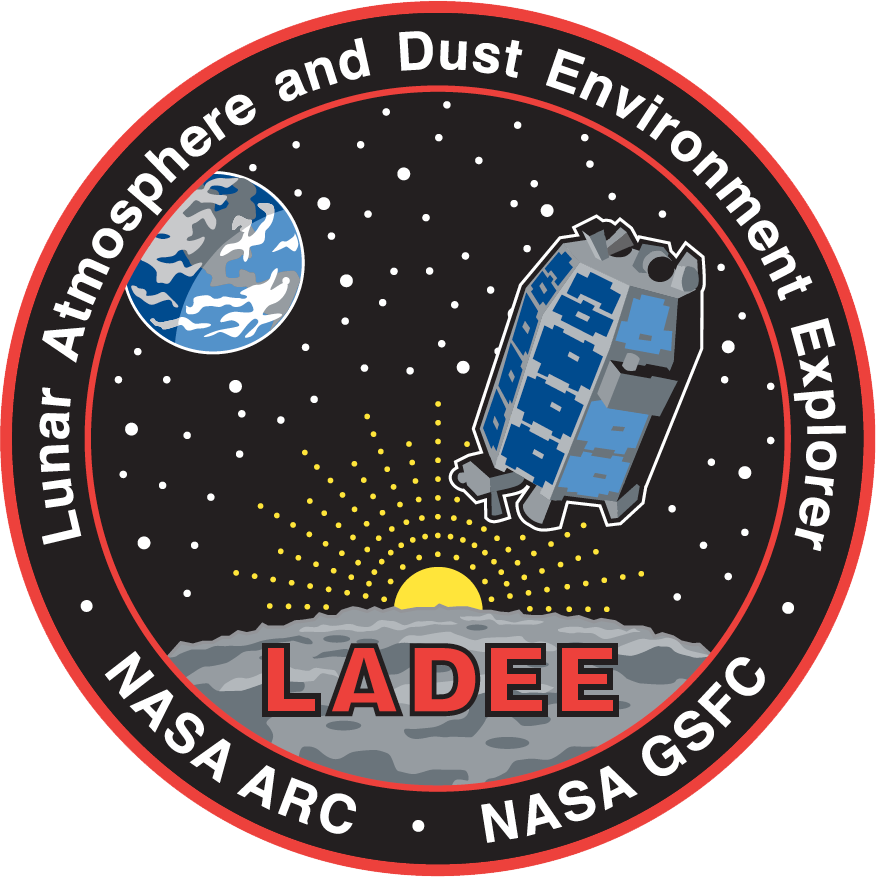
- Logotype of the mission

The Lunar Atmosphere and Dust Environment Explorer (LADEE; /ˈlædi/) was a NASA lunar exploration and technology demonstration mission. It was launched on a Minotaur V rocket from the Mid-Atlantic Regional Spaceport on September 7, 2013. During its seven-month mission LADEE orbited the Moon's equator studying the lunar exosphere and dust in the Moon's vicinity. Its instruments included a dust detector, neutral mass spectrometer, and ultraviolet-visible spectrometer, as well as a technology demonstration consisting of a laser communications terminal. The mission ended on April 18, 2014, when the spacecraft's controllers intentionally crashed LADEE into the far side of the Moon, which was later determined to be near the eastern rim of Sundman V crater.

== Planning and preparations ==
LADEE was announced during the presentation of NASA's FY09 budget in February 2008. It was initially planned to be launched with the Gravity Recovery and Interior Laboratory (GRAIL) satellites.

Mechanical tests including acoustic, vibration and shock tests were completed prior to full-scale thermal vacuum chamber testing at NASA's Ames Research Center in April 2013. During August 2013, LADEE underwent final balancing, fuelling and mounting on the launcher, and all pre-launch activities were complete by August 31, ready for the launch window which opened on September 6.

NASA Ames was responsible for the day-to-day functions of LADEE while the Goddard Space Flight Center operated the sensor suite and technology demonstration payloads as well as managing launch operations. The LADEE mission cost approximately $280 million, which included spacecraft development and science instruments, launch services, mission operations, science processing and relay support.

=== Atmospheric glow ===
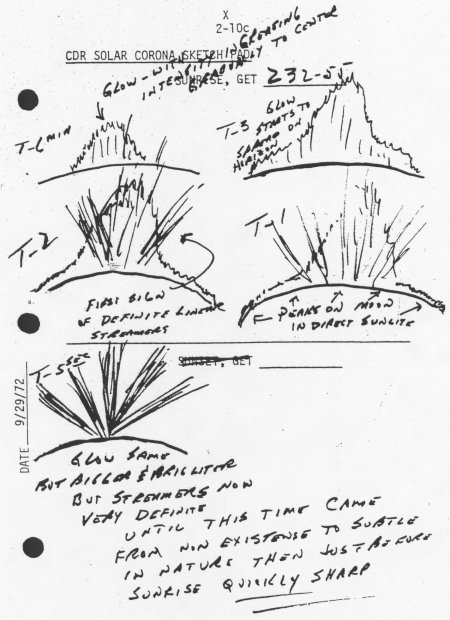
At sunrise and sunset various Apollo crews saw glows and rays. This Apollo 17 sketch depicts the mysterious twilight rays.

The Moon may have a tenuous atmosphere of moving particles constantly leaping up from and falling back to the Moon's surface, giving rise to a "dust atmosphere" that looks static but is composed of dust particles in constant motion. According to models proposed starting from 1956, on the daylit side of the Moon, solar ultraviolet and X-ray radiation is energetic enough to knock electrons out of atoms and molecules in the lunar soil. Positive charges build up until the tiniest particles of lunar dust (measuring 1 micrometre and smaller) are repelled from the surface and lofted anywhere from metres to kilometres high, with the smallest particles reaching the highest altitudes. Eventually they fall back toward the surface where the process is repeated. On the night side, the dust is negatively charged by electrons in the solar wind. Indeed, the "fountain model" suggests that the night side would charge up to higher voltages than the day side, possibly launching dust particles to higher velocities and altitudes. This effect could be further enhanced during the portion of the Moon's orbit where it passes through Earth's magnetotail; see Magnetic field of the Moon for more detail. On the terminator there could be significant horizontal electric fields forming between the day and night areas, resulting in horizontal dust transport.

Also, the Moon has been shown to have a "sodium tail" too faint to be detected by the human eye. It is hundreds of thousands of miles long, and was discovered in 1998 as a result of Boston University scientists observing the Leonid meteor storm. The Moon is constantly releasing atomic sodium gas from its surface, and solar radiation pressure accelerates the sodium atoms in the anti-sunward direction, forming an elongated tail which points away from the Sun. As of April 2013, it had not yet been determined whether ionized sodium gas atoms or charged dust are the cause of the reported Moon glows.

=== Chinese lander ===
China's Chang'e 3 spacecraft, which was launched on December 1, 2013, and entered lunar orbit on December 6, was expected to contaminate the tenuous lunar exosphere with both propellant from engine firings and lunar dust from the vehicle's landing. While concern was expressed that this could disrupt LADEE's mission, such as its baseline readings of the Moon's exosphere, it instead provided additional science value since both the quantity and composition of the spacecraft's propulsion system exhaust were known. Data from LADEE was used to track the distribution and eventual dissipation of the exhaust and dust in the Moon's exosphere. It was also possible to observe the migration of water, one component of the exhaust, giving insight on how it is transported and becomes trapped around the lunar poles.

== Mission objectives ==
The LADEE mission was designed to address three major science goals:

- Determine the global density, composition, and time variability of the tenuous lunar exosphere before it is perturbed by further human activity;
- Determine if the Apollo astronaut sightings of diffuse emission at tens of kilometers above the surface were sodium glow or dust;
- Document the dust impactor environment (size, frequency) to help guide design engineering for the outpost and also future robotic missions;

and one technology demonstration goal:

- Demonstrate two-way laser communication from lunar orbit.

== Spaceflight operations ==
=== Launch ===
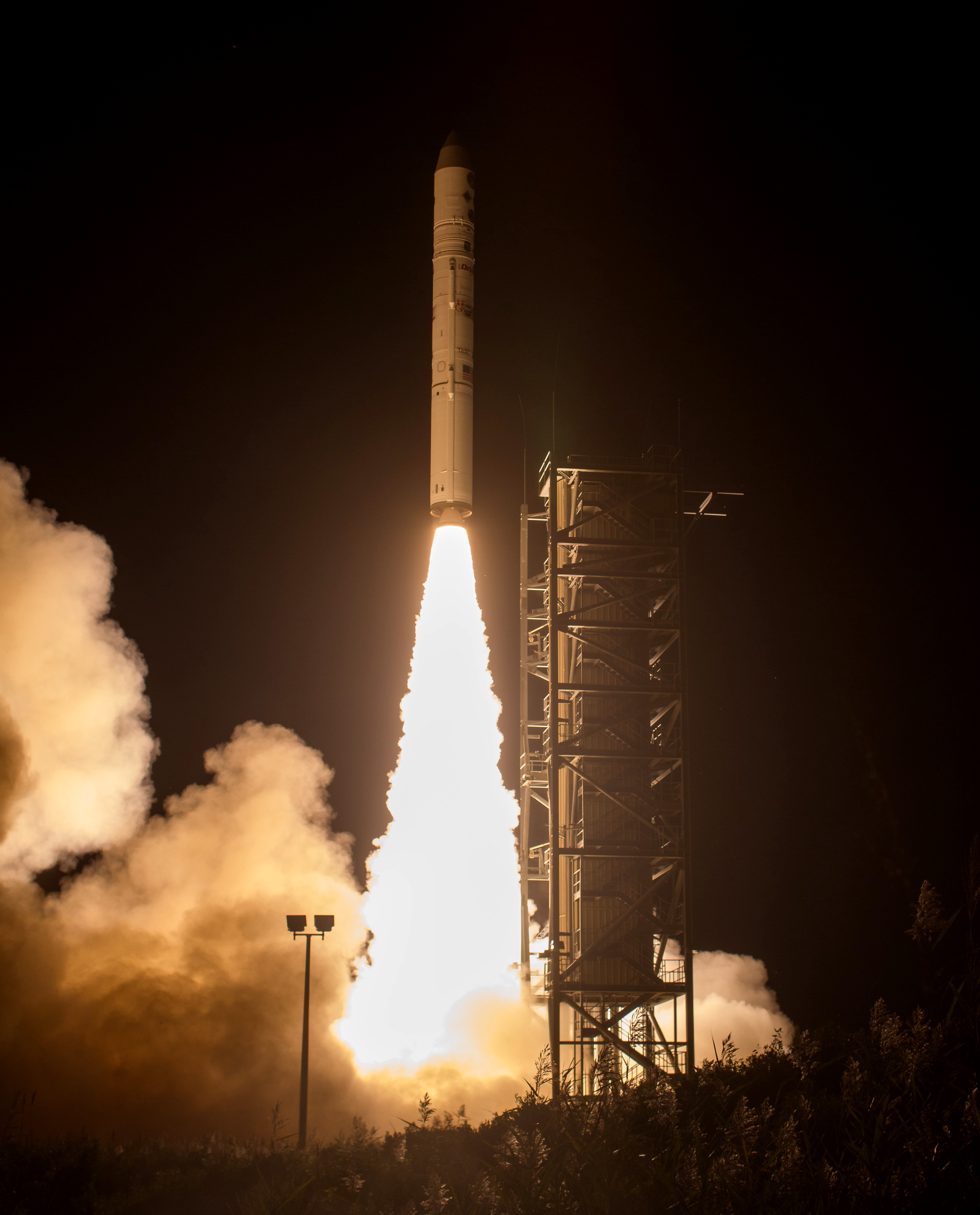
The Minotaur V rocket carrying LADEE during liftoff

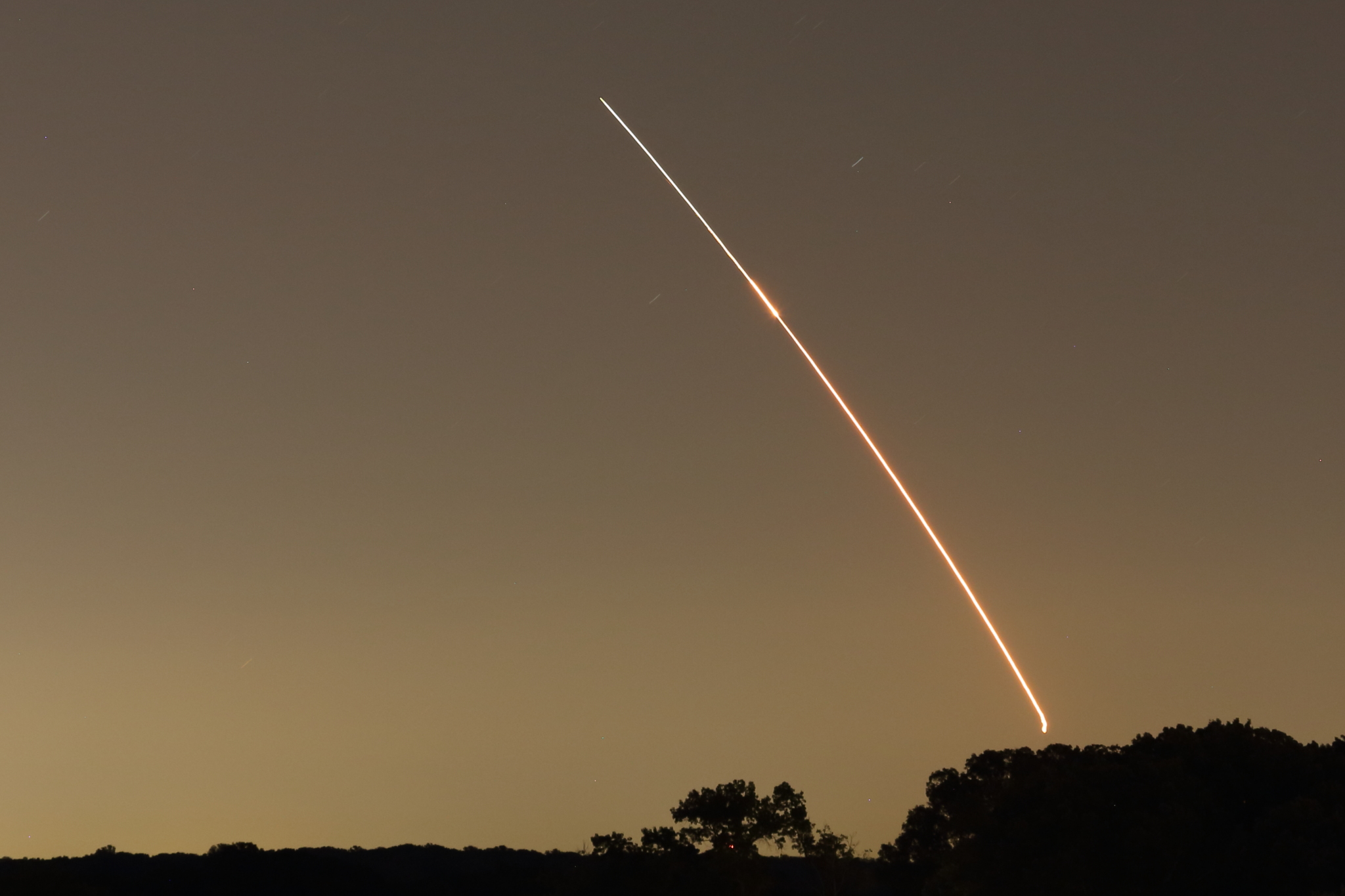
LADEE heads into orbit, as seen from Virginia (long-exposure photo)

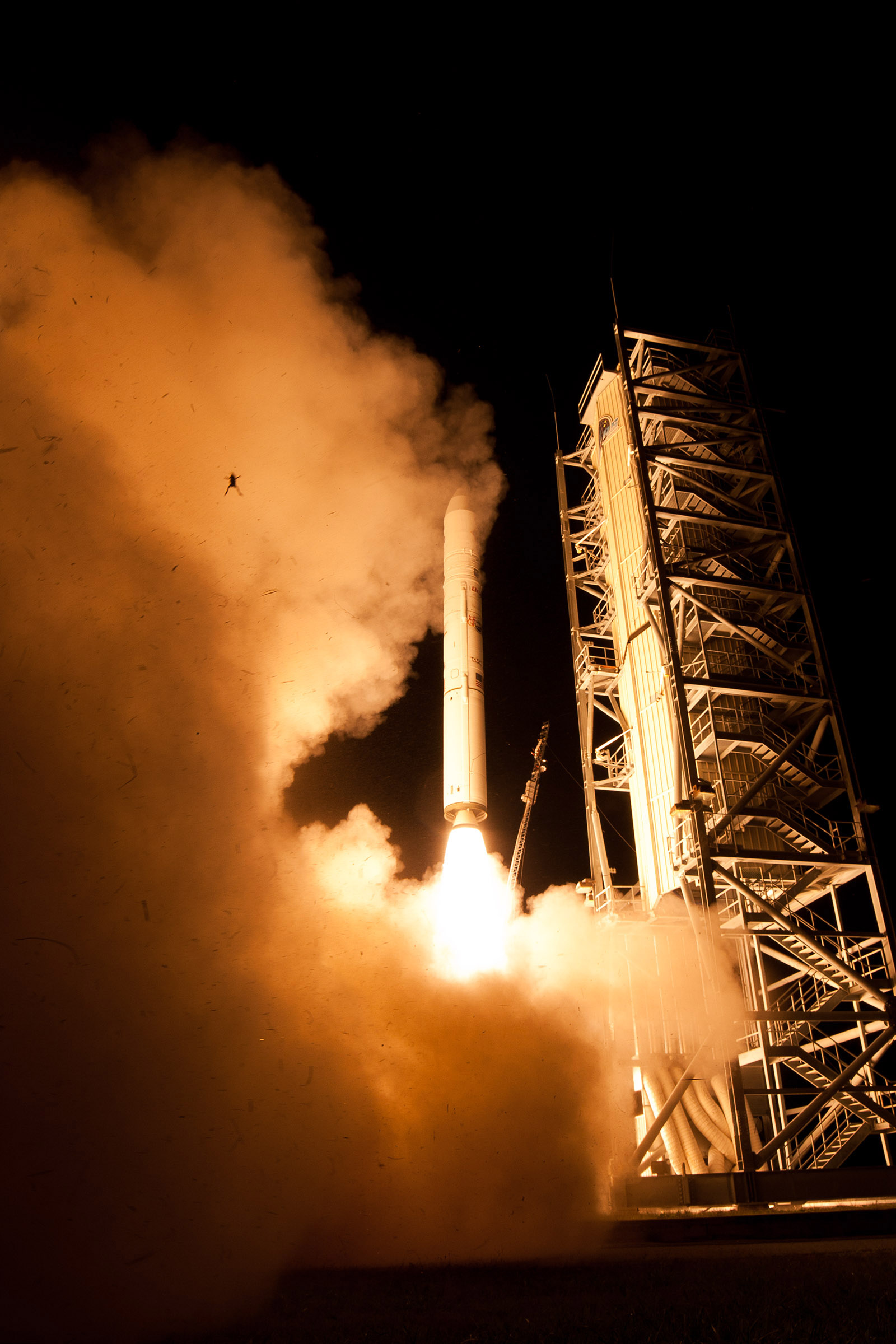
Frog at the LADEE Launch

LADEE was launched on September 7, 2013, at 03:27 UTC (September 6, 11:27 p.m. EDT), from the Wallops Flight Facility at the Mid-Atlantic Regional Spaceport on a Minotaur V carrier rocket. This was the first lunar mission to be launched from that facility. The launch had the potential for visibility along much of the U.S. eastern seaboard, from Maine to South Carolina; clear weather allowed numerous observers from New York City to Virginia to observe the ascent, first stage cutoff and second stage ignition.

As the Minotaur V is a solid-propellant rocket, spacecraft attitude control on this mission operated a bit differently from a typical liquid-fueled rocket with more continuous closed-loop feedback. The first three Minotaur stages "fly a pre-programmed attitude profile" to gain velocity and deliver the vehicle to its preliminary trajectory, while the fourth stage is used to modify the flight profile and deliver the LADEE spacecraft into perigee for the spin-stabilized fifth stage to then put the spacecraft into a highly elliptical orbit around Earth—the first of three—to begin a month-long Lunar transit.

While now separated from the LADEE spacecraft, both the fourth and fifth stages of the Minotaur V reached orbit, and are now space debris in Earth orbit.

A launch photo with a frog thrown high by the pressure wave became popular on social media. The frog's condition is uncertain.

=== Lunar transit ===
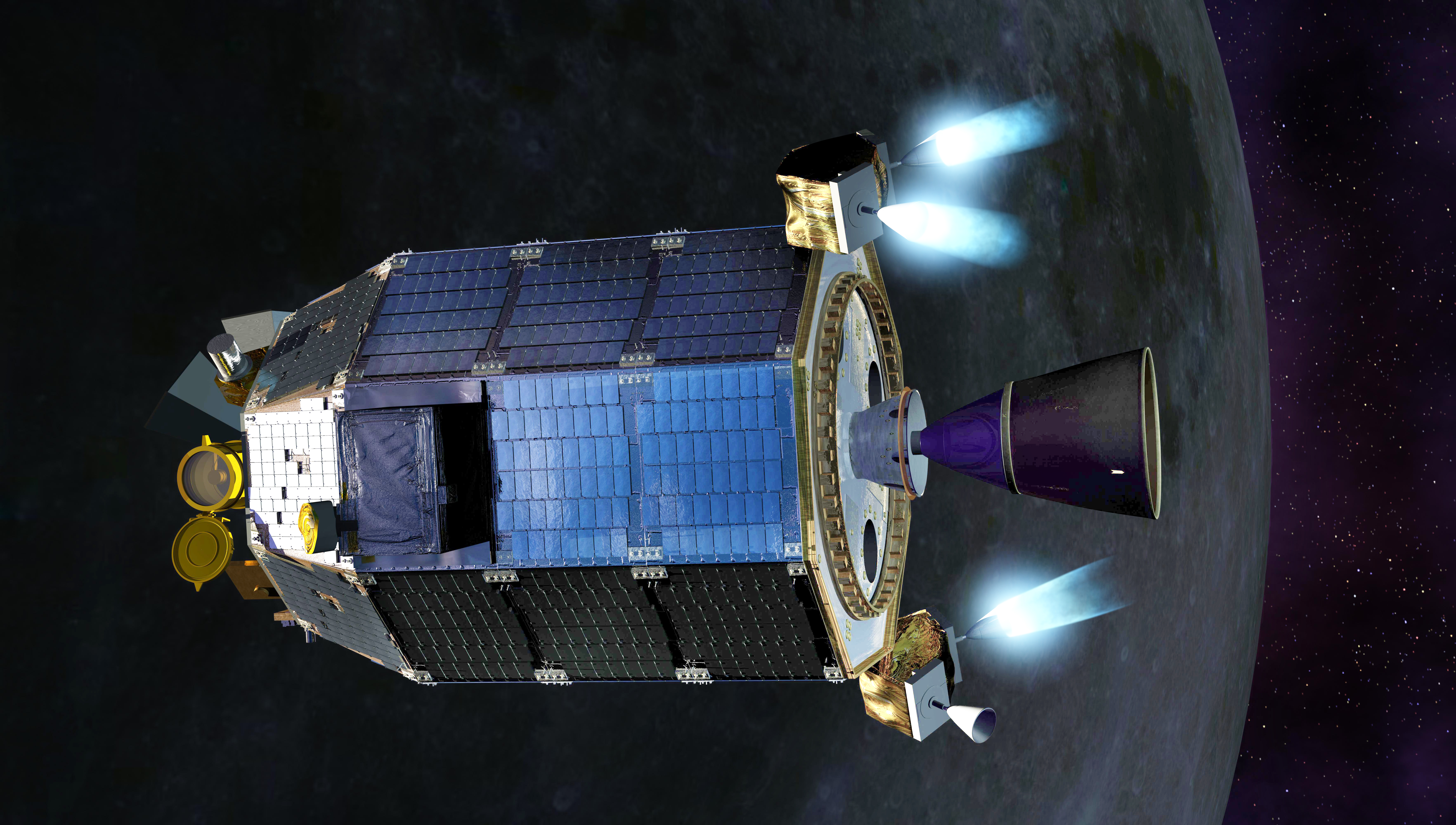
Artist concept of LADEE firing thrusters

Animation of LADEE's trajectory from September 7, 2013, to October 31, 2013
LADEE · Moon · Earth

Animation of LADEE's trajectory around Moon from October 1, 2013, to April 17, 2014
LADEE · Moon

LADEE took an unusual approach in its transit of the Moon. Launched into a highly elliptical Earth orbit, the spacecraft made three increasingly larger laps around Earth before getting close enough to enter into Lunar orbit. The transit required approximately one month.

After separating from the Minotaur, high electrical currents were detected in the satellite's reaction wheels causing them to be shut down. There was no indication of a fault, and after the protection limits were adjusted, orientation with reaction wheels was resumed the following day.

The LADEE spacecraft made three "phasing orbits" of Earth before it accomplished a Lunar orbit insertion (LOI), which occurred at perigee of the third orbit using a three-minute engine burn. The target orbit for the third Earth orbit had a perigee of 200 kilometers (120 mi), an apogee of 278,000 km (173,000 mi) and an inclination of 37.65 degrees. The planned argument of perigee is 155 degrees, while its characteristic energy, C3 is -2.75 km^{2}/s^{2}. The novel trajectory using orbital phasing loops was done for four main reasons:

- the Minotaur V launch vehicle had insufficient delta-v to put the 383 kg (844 lb) LADEE directly into a trans-lunar injection.
- to handle potential off-nominal launch dispersions from the Minotaur V—which is a stack of five solid rocket stages, and is not considered to be a particularly precise rocket—in a propellant-efficient manner while leaving the orbit profile flexible to large dispersions in the initial injection orbit.
- to widen the launch window to five days. In the event, LADEE did not need this as the launch occurred at the beginning of the window on the first day.
- to increase mission robustness in the face of any anomalous or missed orbital maneuvers with the spacecraft.

=== Lunar orbit and systems checkout ===
LADEE entered lunar orbit on October 6, 2013, when LADEE was put into an elliptical capture orbit of 24 hours duration. LADEE was further lowered into a four-hour orbit on October 9, 2013, One further burn occurred on October 12 lowering LADEE into a circular orbit around the Moon with an altitude of approximately 250 kilometers (160 mi) for its commissioning phase, which lasted about 30 days. LADEE's systems and instruments were checked out after the orbit was lowered to 75 km (47 mi) altitude.

=== Lunar Laser Communication Demonstration ===
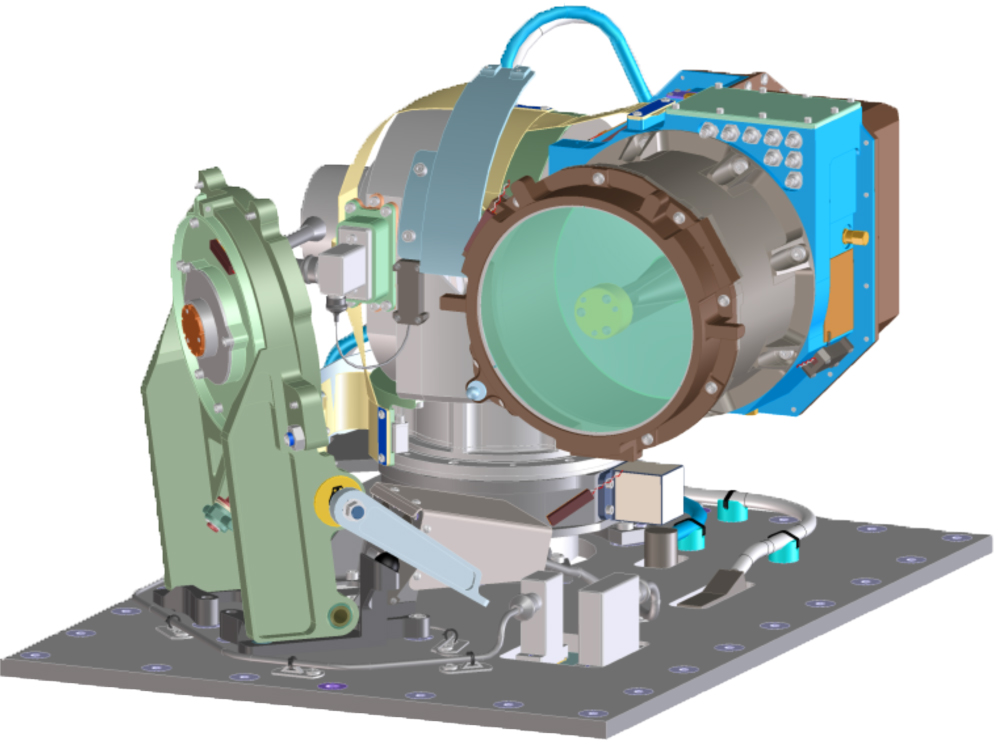
CAD assembly depiction of the optical module of the LLCD

LADEE's Lunar Laser Communication Demonstration (LLCD) pulsed laser system conducted a successful test on October 18, 2013, transmitting data between the spacecraft and its ground station on Earth at a distance of 385,000 kilometres (239,000 mi). This test set a downlink record of 622 megabits per second (Mbps) from spacecraft to ground, and an "error-free data upload rate of 20 Mbps" from ground station to spacecraft. Tests were carried out over a 30-day test period.

The LLCD is a free-space optical communication system. It is NASA's first attempt at two-way space communication using an optical laser instead of radio waves. It is expected to lead to operational laser systems on future NASA satellites.

=== Science phase ===
For the science operations, LADEE was maneuvered into an orbit with a periselene of 20 km (12 mi) and an aposelene of 60 km (37 mi). The science phase of LADEE's primary mission was initially planned as 100 days, and later given a 28-day extension. The extension provided an opportunity for the satellite to gather an additional full lunar cycle worth of very low-altitude data to help scientists unravel the nature of the Moon's tenuous exosphere.

=== End of mission ===
Spacecraft controllers ordered a final engine burn on April 11, 2014, to lower LADEE to within 2 km (1 mi) of the Moon's surface and set it up for impact no later than April 21. The probe then dealt with the April 2014 lunar eclipse on April 15, during which it could not generate power because it was in Earth's shadow for four hours. Science instruments were turned off and heaters were cycled during the event to conserve energy while keeping the spacecraft warm. Engineers did not expect LADEE to survive, as it was not designed to handle such an environment, but it exited the eclipse with only a few pressure sensor malfunctions.

During its penultimate orbit on April 17, LADEE's periapsis took it within 300 m (1,000 ft) of the lunar surface. Contact with the spacecraft was lost around 04:30 UTC on April 18 when it moved behind the Moon. LADEE struck the Moon's far side surface some time between 04:30 and 05:22 at a speed of 5,800 km/h (3,600 mph). The far side of the Moon was chosen to avoid the possibility of damaging historically important locations such as the Luna and Apollo landing sites. NASA used the Lunar Reconnaissance Orbiter to image the impact location, which was determined to be near the eastern rim of Sundman V crater.

LADEE - Impact Crater

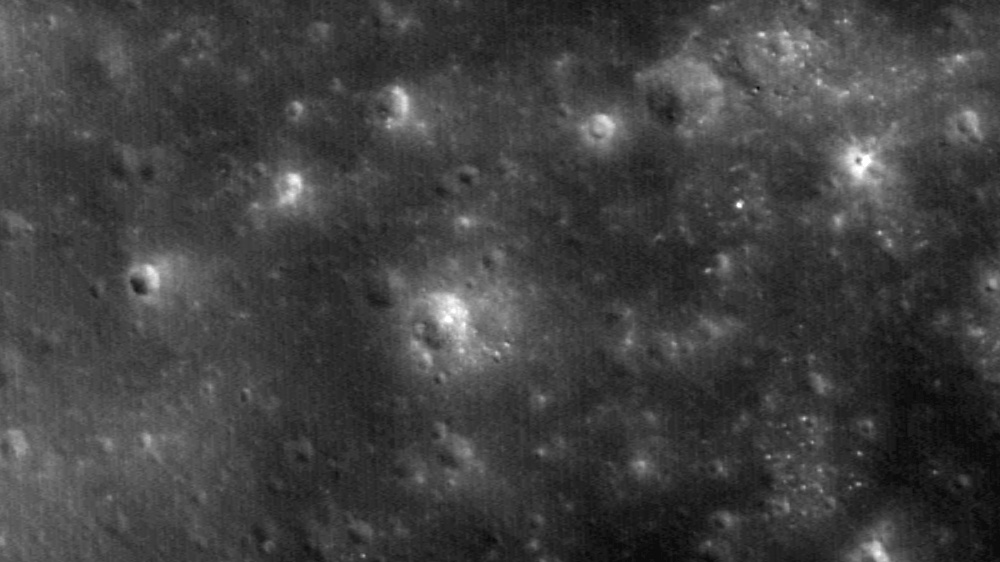
Before impact

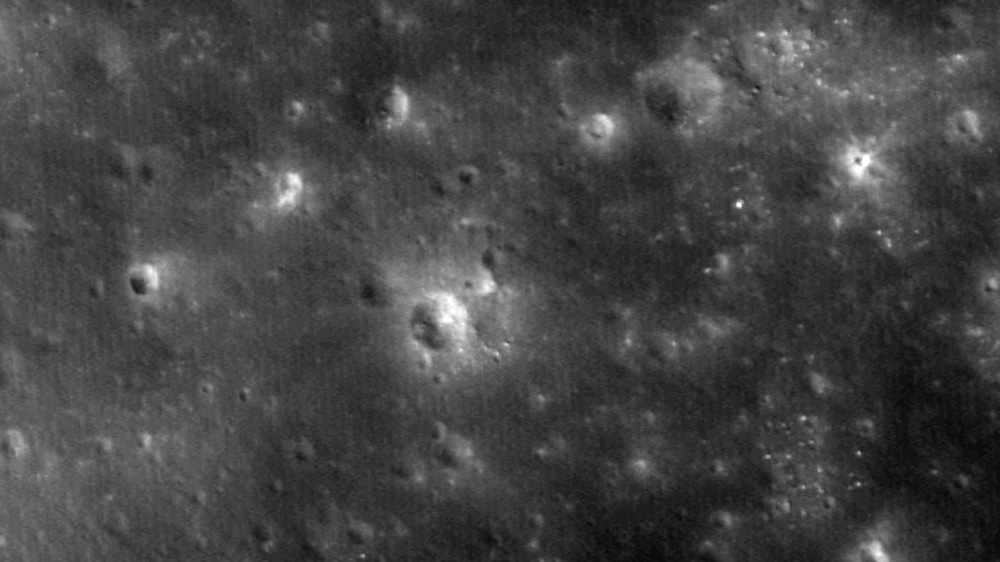
After impact

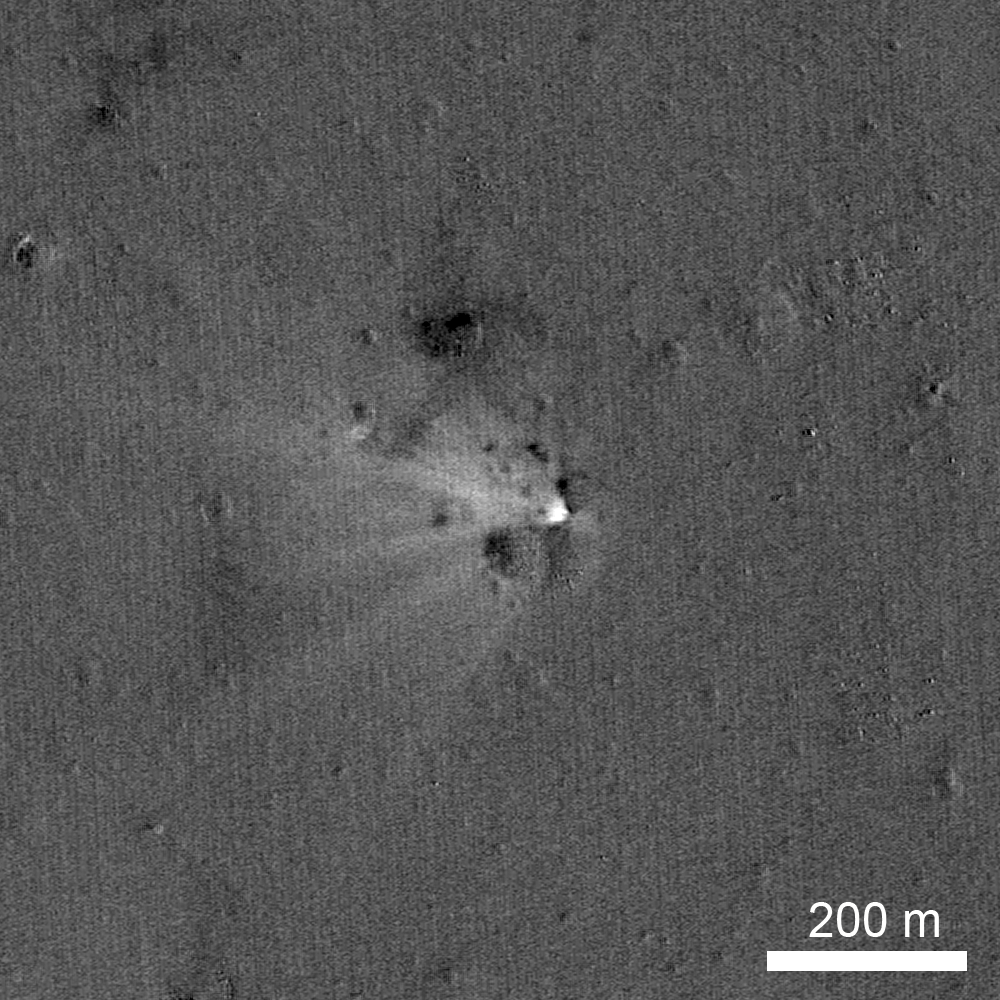
Superimposed images

Sundman V crater (eastern rim); April 18, 2014

== Spacecraft ==
=== Design ===
LADEE is the first spacecraft designed, integrated, built, and tested by NASA's Ames Research Center. The spacecraft is of a novel design (a spacecraft bus never previously flown)—and of much lower cost than typical NASA science missions—which presented novel challenges to the trajectory design team in getting the new spacecraft launched to the Moon with a high-confidence spaceflight trajectory plan, while dealing with a first-use new rocket (Minotaur V) and a spacecraft with no flight test legacy. (see Lunar transit, above.)

LADEE mission makes use of the Modular Common Spacecraft Bus, or body, made of a lightweight carbon composite with an unfueled mass of 248.2 kg (547 lb). The bus has the ability to perform on various kinds of missions—including voyages to the Moon and Near-Earth objects—with different modules or applicable systems. This modular concept is an innovative way of transitioning away from custom designs and toward multi-use designs and assembly-line production, which could dramatically reduce the cost of spacecraft development. The LADEE spacecraft bus modules consist of the Radiator Module which carries the avionics, electrical system, and attitude sensors; the Bus Module; the Payload Module that carries the two largest instruments; and the Extension Modules, which house the propulsion system.

Specifications

The main structure is 2.37 m (7.8 ft) high, 1.85 m (6.1 ft) wide and 1.85 m (6.1 ft) deep. The total mass of the spacecraft is 383 kg (844 lb).

=== Power ===
Electrical power was generated by a photovoltaic system composed of 30 panels of silicon solar cells producing 295 W at one AU. The solar panels were mounted on the satellite's exterior surfaces and the electrical power was stored in one lithium-ion battery providing up to 24 Ah of 28-volt power.

=== Propulsion system ===
The LADEE propulsion system consisted of an orbit control system (OCS) and a reaction control system (RCS). The OCS provided velocity control along the +Z axis for large velocity adjustments. The RCS provided three-axis attitude control during burns of the OCS system, and also provided momentum dumps for the reaction wheels which were the primary attitude control system between OCS burns.

The main engine was a 455N High Performance Apogee Thruster (HiPAT). The high efficiency 22N attitude control thrusters are manufactured using high temperature materials and similar to the HiPAT. The main engine provided the majority of the thrust for spacecraft trajectory correction maneuvers. The control system thrusters were used for the small maneuvers planned for the science phase of the mission.

Following the science phase, a decommissioning period occurred, during which the altitude was gradually lowered until the spacecraft impacted the lunar surface.

=== Science payload ===
LADEE carried three scientific instruments and a technology demonstration payload.

The science payload consists of:

- The Neutral Mass Spectrometer (NMS), which performed in situ measurements of exospheric atoms and molecules via mass spectroscopy. Parts of NMS were based on the SAM instrument on the Mars Science Laboratory.
- The UV-Vis Spectrometer (UVS), which measured both the dust and exosphere by ultraviolet–visible spectroscopy. The instrument was based on the UV-Vis spectrometer on the LCROSS mission.
- Lunar Dust EXperiment (LDEX), which directly measured dust using an impact ionization detector. This functions by measuring the ionization of particles hitting the detector. The instrument built on experience gained from similar instruments on Galileo, Ulysses, and Cassini.

=== Technology demonstration payload ===
LADEE also carried a technology demonstration payload for testing an optical communication system. The Lunar Laser Communication Demonstration (LLCD) used a laser to transmit and receive data as pulses of light, in much the same way as data is transferred in a fiber optic cable. Three ground stations were used. This method of communication could potentially provide data rates five times higher than the previous radio frequency communication system. The technology is a direct predecessor to NASA's Laser Communications Relay Demonstration (LCRD) system which was due to launch in 2017, and actually launched in 2021.

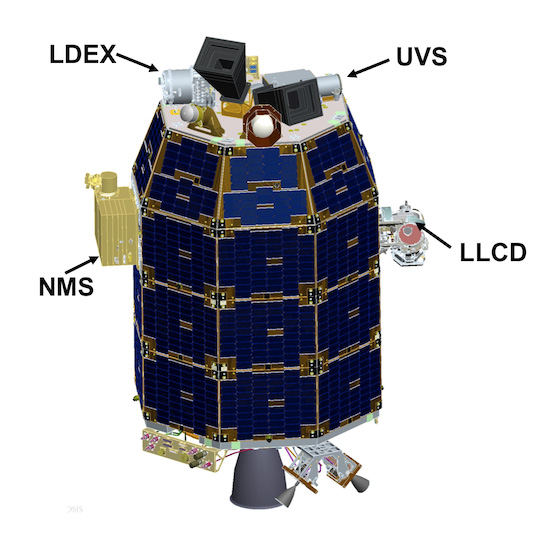
LADEE with instruments labeled

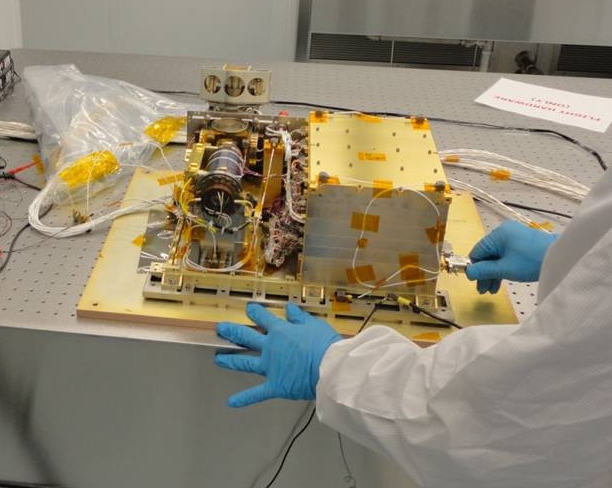
NMS

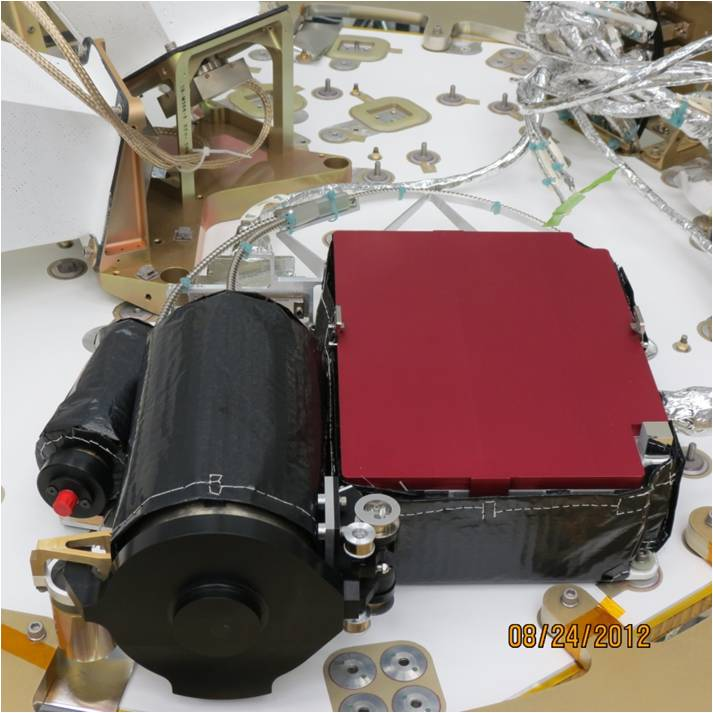
UVS

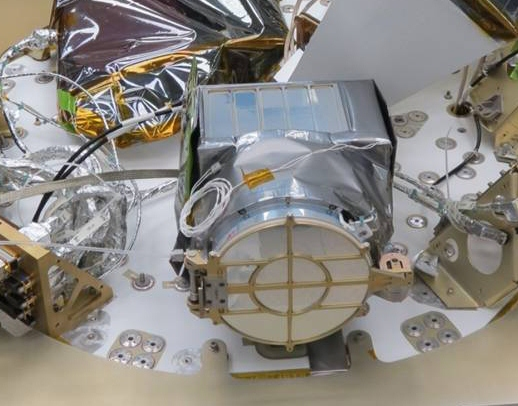
LDEX

== Results ==
Scientists have discovered that water is being released from the Moon during meteor showers. The video features additional narration from the mission and an extended interview with scientist Mehdi Benna.

The LADEE science teams continued to analyze data acquired at the time of the Chang'e 3 landing on December 14, 2013. The spacecraft impacted the moon on April 17th 2014.

The LADEE mission won the 2014 Popular Mechanics Breakthrough Award.

- The Lunar Dust EXperiment (LDEX) team noted an increase in dust around the time of the landing. However, the rise preceded the landing time by many hours, suggesting a different origin. Indeed, the Geminids meteor shower coincided with this landing event and produced elevated dust counts before, during and after the landing period. The team reported that "if LADEE did encounter any lunar soil particles thrown up by the final descent of Chang'e 3, they would have been lost in the background of Geminid-produced events."
- The Neutral Mass Spectrometer (NMS) team has been searching the data for exhaust gas species such as water, carbon monoxide and carbon dioxide (CO and CO_{2}) as well as nitrogen (N_{2}).
- The Ultraviolet and Visible light Spectrometer (UVS) carried out a series of before/after observations looking for effects of both the landing and meteor showers. Analysis revealed an increase in sodium in the exosphere in connection with the Geminid meteor shower, as well as evidence of increased light scattering due to dust. The UVS also monitored emission lines of atomic oxygen, and saw emissions that may have indicated the presence of both iron (Fe) and titanium (Ti), which were expected but they had never before been observed.
- ^{4}He, ^{20}Ne, and ^{40}Ar gases were determined to be the most abundant species in the lunar exosphere. The helium and neon were found to be supplied by the solar wind.
- On August 17, 2015, based on studies with the LADEE spacecraft, NASA scientists reported the detection of neon in the exosphere of the Moon.
- In 2019, based on data collected by the LADEE spacecraft, Researchers from NASA and the Johns Hopkins University Applied Physics Laboratory that some meteoroids that strike the surface of moon briefly infuse the lunar atmosphere with water vapor. This finding has helped scientists better understand the history of lunar water.

== Team ==
The team for LADEE included contributors from NASA Headquarters, Washington D.C., NASA's Ames Research Center, Moffett Field, California, NASA's Goddard Space Flight Center, Greenbelt, Maryland, and the Laboratory for Atmospheric and Space Physics at the University of Colorado at Boulder. Guest investigators include those from the University of California, Berkeley;The Johns Hopkins University Applied Physics Laboratory, Laurel, Maryland; the University of Colorado; the University of Maryland; and NASA's Goddard Space Flight Center, Greenbelt, Maryland.

== Gallery ==
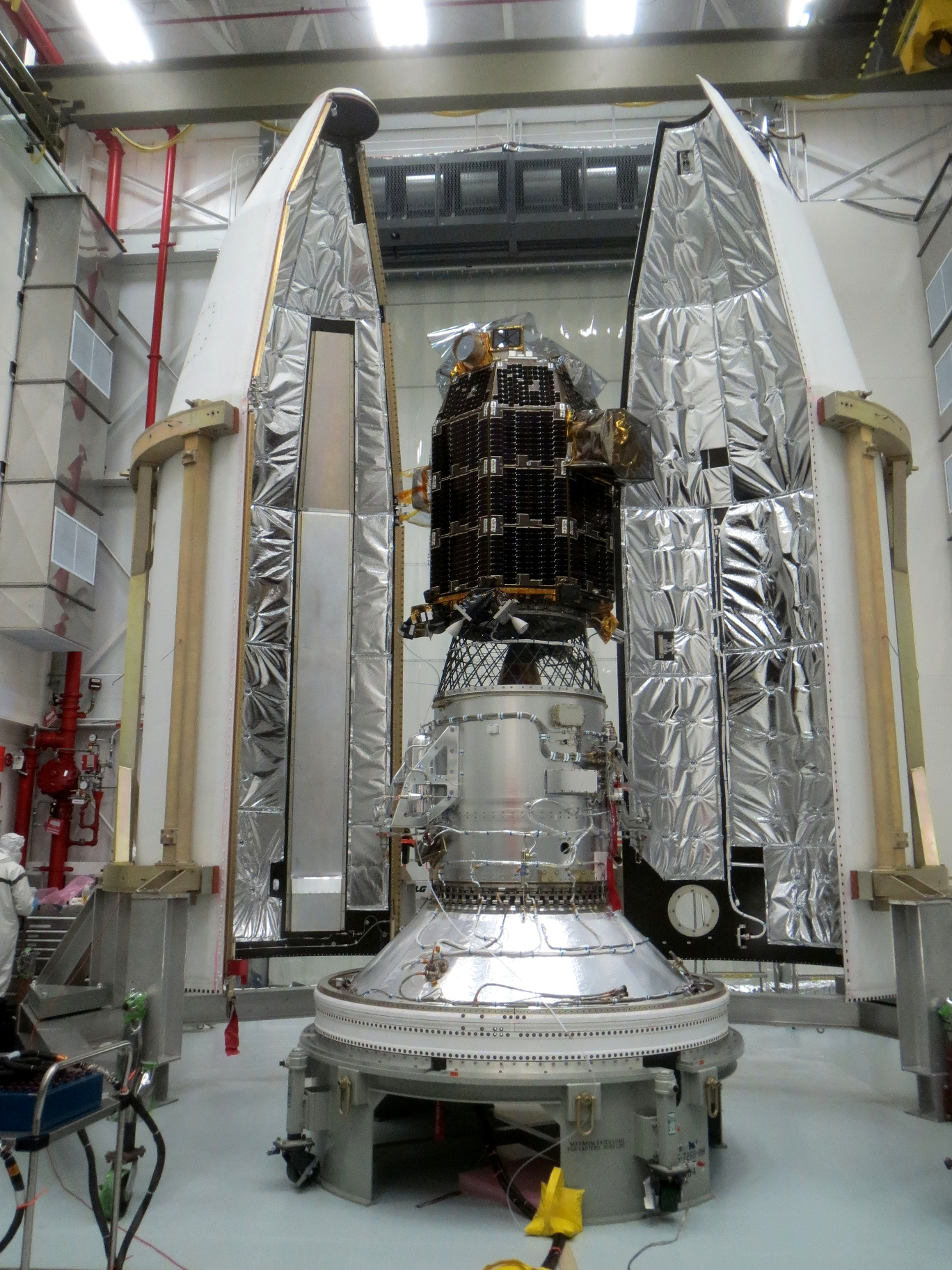
LADEE in August 2013, prior to being encapsulated into its fairing

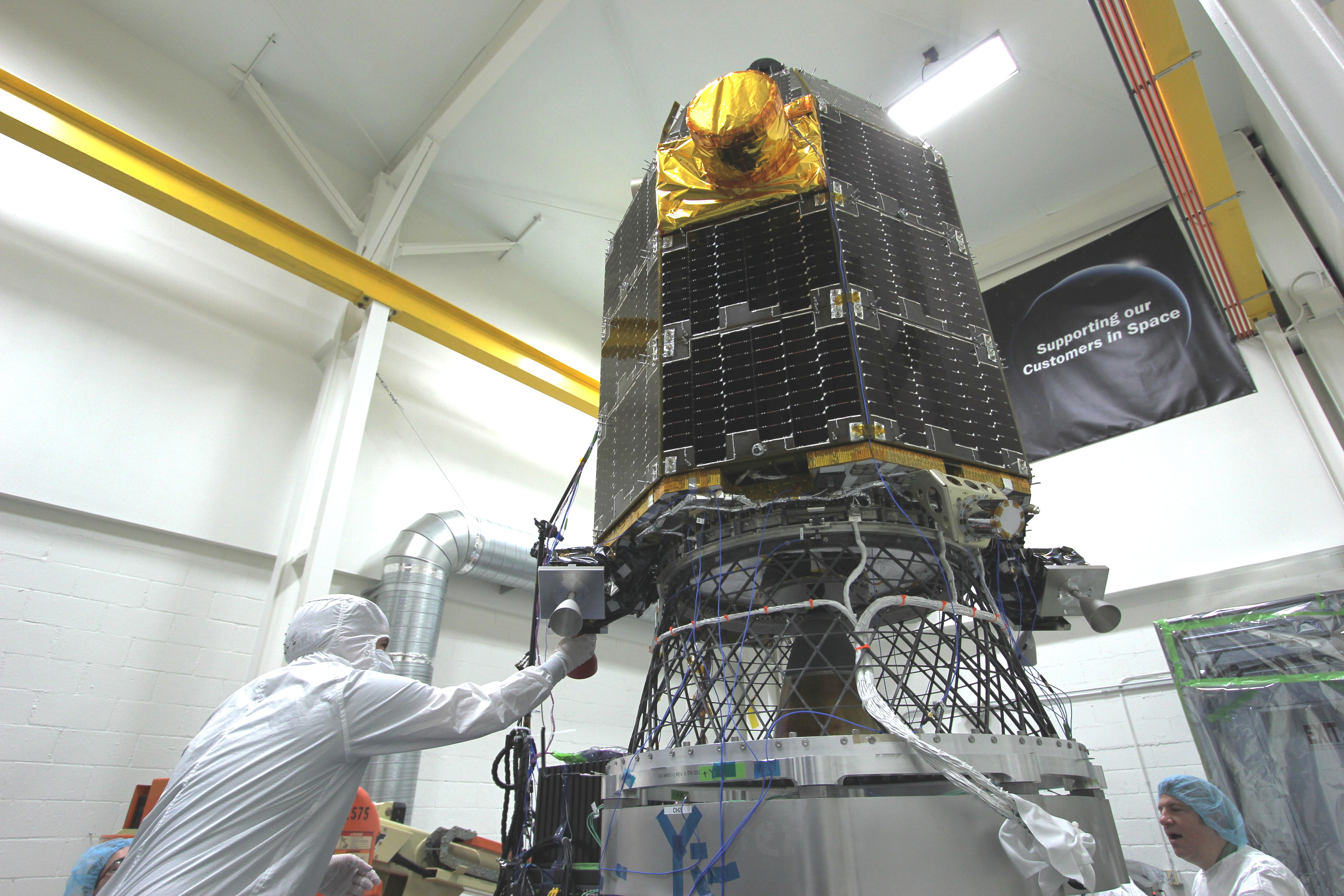
LADEE mounted on the vibration table prior to the start of vibration testing in January 2013

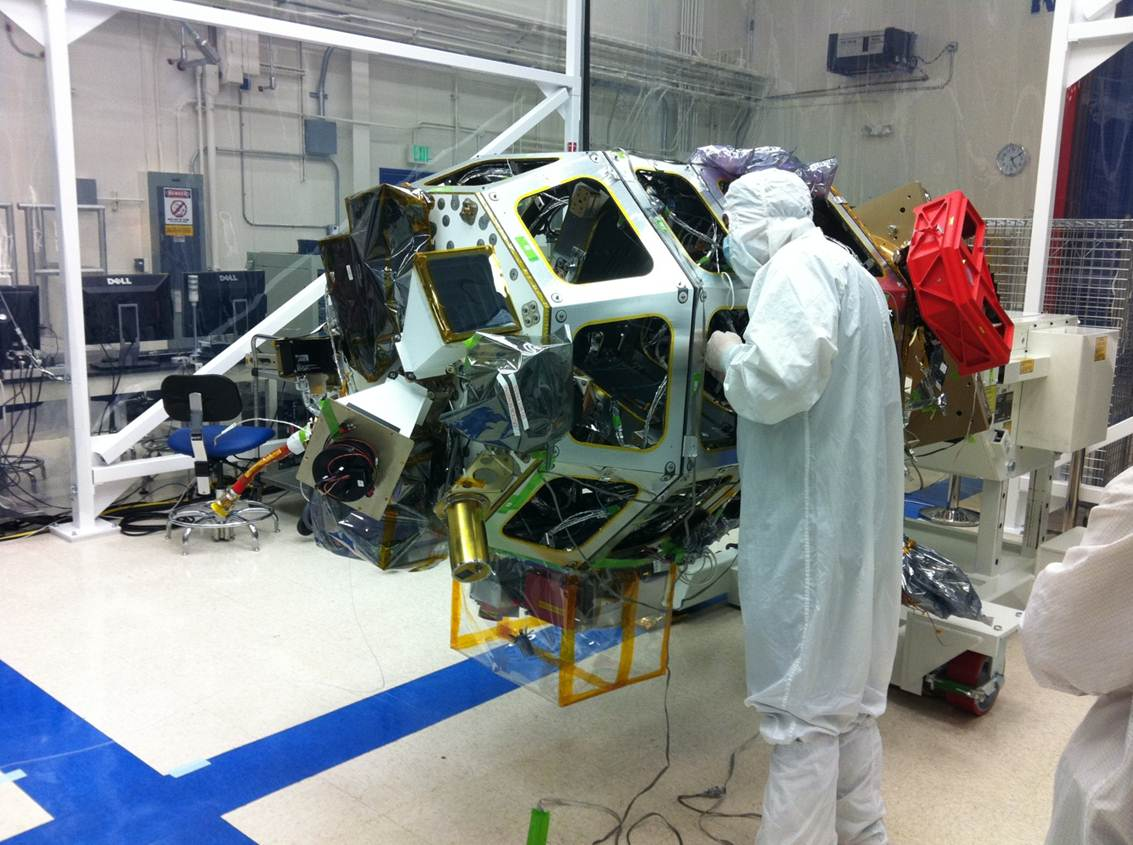
LADEE in the clean room at Ames Research Center before its solar panels were attached

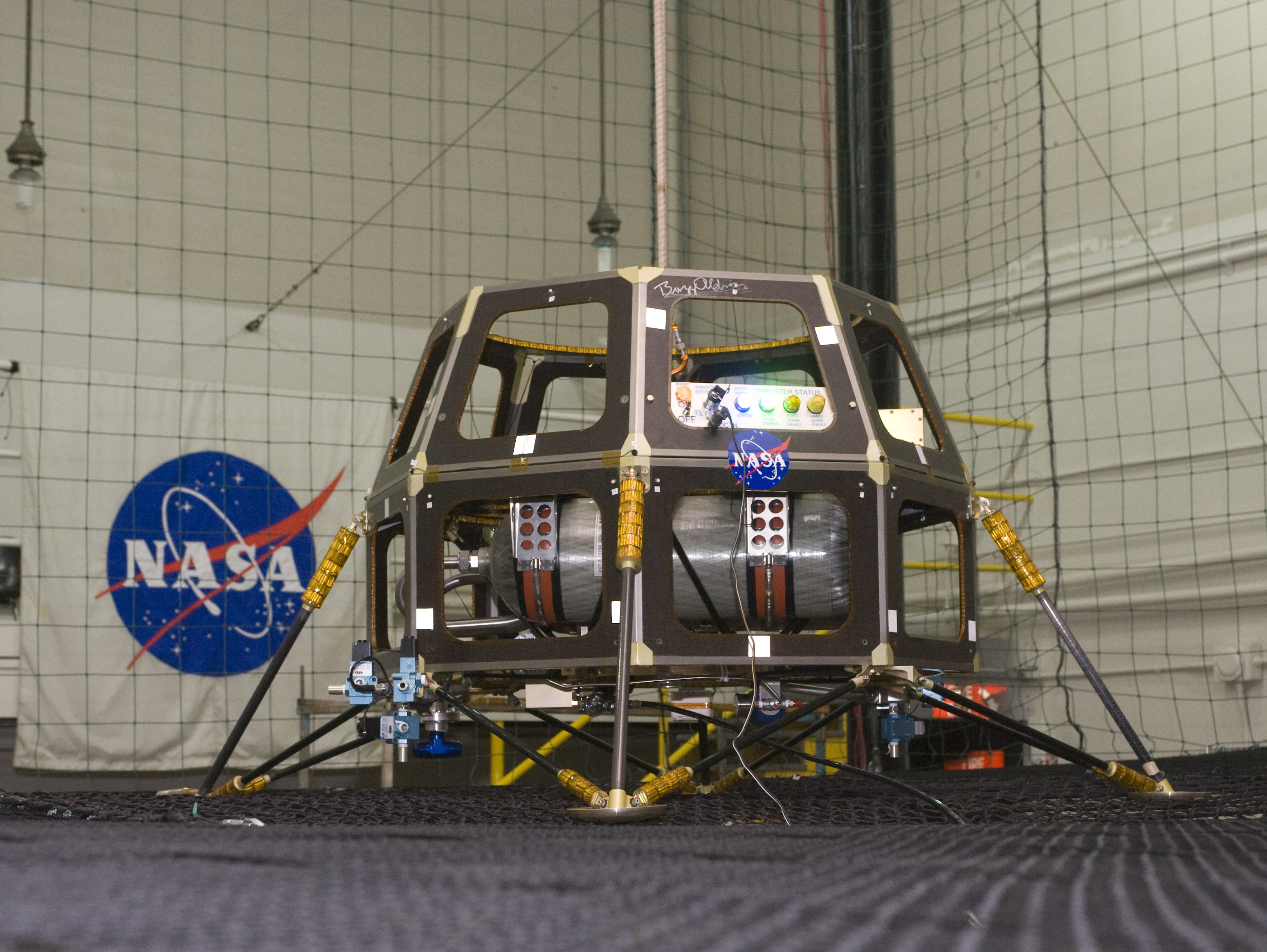
The Modular Common Spacecraft Bus that would become LADEE's bus, being tested at Ames in 2008. Note Apollo 11 astronaut Buzz Aldrin's signature at the top of the bus.
First images of the Moon captured by LADEE's star tracker, taken February 8, 2014.

== See also ==
- List of artificial objects on the Moon
- List of missions to the Moon
