= Pulsed laser =

Any laser not classified as continuous-wave

Pulsed operation of lasers refers to any laser not classified as continuous wave, so that the optical power appears in pulses of some duration at some repetition rate. This encompasses a wide range of technologies addressing a number of different motivations. Some lasers are pulsed simply because they cannot be run in continuous mode.

In other cases the application requires the production of pulses having as large an energy as possible. Since the pulse energy is equal to the average power divided by the repetition rate, this goal can sometimes be satisfied by lowering the rate of pulses so that more energy can be built up in between pulses. In laser ablation for example, a small volume of material at the surface of a work piece can be ablated if it is heated in a very short time, whereas supplying the energy gradually would allow for the heat to be absorbed into the bulk of the piece, never attaining a sufficiently high temperature at a particular point.

Other applications rely on the peak pulse power (rather than the energy in the pulse), especially in order to obtain nonlinear optical effects. For a given pulse energy, this requires creating pulses of the shortest possible duration utilizing techniques such as Q-switching.

The optical bandwidth of a pulse cannot be narrower than the reciprocal of the pulse width. In the case of extremely short pulses, that implies lasing over a considerable bandwidth, quite contrary to the very narrow bandwidths typical of continuous wave (CW) lasers. The lasing medium in some dye lasers and vibronic solid-state lasers produces optical gain over a wide bandwidth, making a laser possible which can thus generate pulses of light as short as a few femtoseconds.

== Q-switching ==
In a Q-switched laser, the population inversion is allowed to build up by introducing loss inside the resonator which exceeds the gain of the medium; this can also be described as a reduction of the quality factor or 'Q' of the cavity. Then, after the pump energy stored in the laser medium has approached the maximum possible level, the introduced loss mechanism (often an electro- or acousto-optical element) is rapidly removed (or that occurs by itself in a passive device), allowing lasing to begin which rapidly obtains the stored energy in the gain medium. This results in a short pulse incorporating that energy, and thus a high peak power.

== Mode-locking ==
A mode-locked laser is capable of emitting extremely short pulses on the order of tens of picoseconds down to less than 10 femtoseconds. These pulses will repeat at the round trip time, that is, the time that it takes light to complete one round trip between the mirrors comprising the resonator. Due to the Fourier limit (also known as energy-time uncertainty), a pulse of such short temporal length has a spectrum spread over a considerable bandwidth. Thus such a gain medium must have a gain bandwidth sufficiently broad to amplify those frequencies. An example of a suitable material is titanium-doped, artificially grown sapphire (Ti:sapphire) which has a very wide gain bandwidth and can thus produce pulses of only a few femtoseconds duration.

Such mode-locked lasers are a most versatile tool for researching processes occurring on extremely short time scales (known as femtosecond physics, femtosecond chemistry and ultrafast science), for maximizing the effect of nonlinearity in optical materials (e.g. in second-harmonic generation, parametric down-conversion, optical parametric oscillators and the like) due to the large peak power, and in ablation applications. Again, because of the extremely short pulse duration, such a laser will produce pulses which achieve an extremely high peak power.

== Pulsed pumping ==
Another method of achieving pulsed laser operation is to pump the laser material with a source that is itself pulsed, either through electronic charging in the case of flash lamps, or another laser which is already pulsed. Pulsed pumping was historically used with dye lasers where the inverted population lifetime of a dye molecule was so short that a high energy, fast pump was needed. The way to overcome this problem was to charge up large capacitors which are then switched to discharge through flashlamps, producing an intense flash. Pulsed pumping is also required for three-level lasers in which the lower energy level rapidly becomes highly populated preventing further lasing until those atoms relax to the ground state. These lasers, such as the excimer laser and the copper vapor laser, can never be operated in CW mode.

== Applications ==
Pulsed Nd:YAG and Er:YAG lasers are used in laser tattoo removal and laser range finders among other applications.

Pulsed lasers are also used in soft-tissue surgery. When a laser beam comes into contact with soft-tissue, one important factor is to not overheat surrounding tissue, so necrosis can be prevented. Laser pulses must be spaced out to allow for efficient tissue cooling (thermal relaxation time) between pulses.

== See also ==
- Ultrashort pulse laser
- Pulsed laser deposition
- Laser ablation
- Laser scalpel
- Soft-tissue laser surgery

== Bibliography ==
- Siegman, Anthony E. (1986). Lasers, University Science Books. ISBN 0-935702-11-3
- Svelto, Orazio (1998). Principles of Lasers, 4th ed. (trans. David Hanna), Springer. ISBN 0-306-45748-2
