= Stewart Nozette =

American scientist (born 1957)

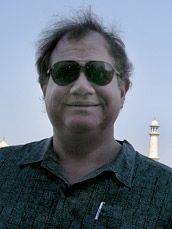
- Born: Stewart David Nozette; May 20, 1957 (age 69); Chicago, Illinois, United States
- Education: University of Arizona; Massachusetts Institute of Technology
- Known for: Attempting to transfer American nuclear and space technology to Israel and India
- Awards: NASA Exceptional Achievement Medal
- Scientific career
- Fields: Geoscience; Planetary Science
- Workplaces: Scripps Institution of Oceanography; University of Texas; Ballistic Missile Defense Organization; United States Department of Energy Lawrence Livermore Laboratory (1990–1999); United States Department of Defense; National Space Council (1989–1990); NASA Goddard Space Flight Center; Alliance for Competitive Technology (1990–present); DARPA
- Thesis: The Physical and Chemical Properties of the Surface of Venus (1983)
- Doctoral advisor: John S. Lewis; Gordon Pettengill

Stewart David Nozette (born May 20, 1957) is an American planetary scientist, technologist, and consultant who worked for the United States Department of Energy, the United States Department of Defense, DARPA, the United States Naval Research Laboratory, and NASA. He is also a convicted felon for attempted espionage and fraud against the United States. The FBI arrested him on October 19, 2009, charging him with attempted espionage after a sting operation which Nozette's lawyer claims amounted to entrapment. At trial, Nozette admitted attempting to sell U.S. classified information to someone he believed was an Israeli Mossad operative, but was in reality an undercover Federal Bureau of Investigation employee. He pleaded guilty to one charge of attempted espionage and was sentenced, under the terms of a plea bargain, to thirteen years in prison. After serving time at the Federal Correctional Institution, Terre Haute, Nozette was released on November 13, 2020.

== Personal life and education ==
Nozette was born in Chicago, Illinois, on May 20, 1957, to Helen and Morris Nozette. He grew up in Chicago’s West Rogers Park neighborhood and earned a B.S. in geosciences with honors and distinction (University of Arizona, 1979), and a Ph.D. in Planetary sciences (Massachusetts Institute of Technology, 1983). He worked a couple of summers in the 1970's as a guide-lecturer at the Museum of Science and Industry (Chicago) while he was home from the University of Arizona.

== Career ==
In 1983-1984 Nozette was co-director of the California Space Institute, affiliated with the Scripps Institution of Oceanography at UC San Diego. From there he went to the University of Texas as an Assistant Professor of Aerospace Engineering Austin, Texas.

In the early 1990s, Nozette, as part of the Strategic Defense Initiative's 'Brilliant Pebbles', conceived the idea (and then led the mission) of the Clementine spacecraft as a means to both provide a test bed for the development of lighter, more cost effective advanced space technology, as well as to obtain data for the Moon.

Nozette and colleagues' bistatic radar results from Clementine claimed to support the discovery of water on the south pole of the Moon. Although the significance of the result was questioned, measurements made by subsequent Lunar missions have supported the hypothesis that the Moon holds substantially greater reserves of water than had been thought based on Apollo program results and confirmed Nozette's original findings. The engineering model of the Clementine spacecraft, which Nozette worked on, hangs in the Air & Space Museum in Washington, DC.

Over the course of his career, Nozette held high level security clearances and worked on sensitive United States nuclear and satellite programs. He held a Q clearance, top secret clearance, and was read into multiple special access programs. He held Top Secret security clearances to study nuclear material with the United States Department of Energy, and was on the National Space Council under President George H. W. Bush. From 1989 to 2006, Nozette held a security clearance as high as top secret and handled documents relating to national security. He left the employ of the U.S. government in 2006.

Nozette worked as a technical consultant for Israel Aerospace Industries between 1998 and 2008. After he left the government job, Nozette was heavily involved in India's extraterrestrial Moon probe, Chandrayaan-1. He was a principal investigator of the Mini-RF instrument on the Lunar Reconnaissance Orbiter and a co-investigator on Chandrayaan-1. Nozette was also the president, treasurer and director of the Alliance for Competitive Technology (ACT), a non-profit organization that he organized in March 1990. In 2006 ACT acted for Mississippi State University in bringing together MSU and British microsatellite manufacturer SSTL to form Infinisat as part of a $20m earmark in the FY05 and 06 NASA budget for NASA Stennis Space Centre courtesy of Mississippi Senator Thad Cochran. ACT was also involved with the $40m earmark in the same budget, courtesy of Alabama Senator Richard Shelby, for MSFC’s lander programme.

== Espionage and arrest ==
Nozette was under investigation by the Justice Department for possible fraudulent billing on a NASA contract by a nonprofit corporation he ran, "Alliance for Competitive Technology". An agent for the NASA inspector general had found billing to NASA for expenses including, among other things, three mortgages, nine credit cards, a tennis club, pool cleaning, and the Mercedes-Benz Credit Corporation. Documents found by the Justice Department while investigating these irregularities included classified documents and an e-mail in which Nozette "threatened to take a classified program on which he worked to an unnamed foreign country or Israel." This information was passed along to the FBI.

In September 2009, Nozette began receiving phone calls from a person claiming to be an agent of Mossad. In reality this was an undercover FBI agent. Nozette expressed a willingness to exchange American intelligence for financial rewards. His first payment was received upon his answers to a list of questions regarding American satellite technology for public access GPS. The information he claimed he would hand over included classified information. A folder left for this contact in a post office box contained "information classified as both top secret and secret that concerned US satellites, early warning systems, means of defense or retaliation against large-scale attack, communications intelligence information, and major elements of defense strategy." The United States Department of Justice criminal complaint, however, does not charge that "the government of Israel or anyone acting on its behalf committed any offense under U.S. laws." Nozette's contention is that this was a sting set up as the result of being forced to co-operate in a planned sting of senior political leadership responsible for NASA funding in Mississippi and Alabama. This is documented in his pardon plea.

According to the criminal complaint, Nozette told his espionage contact that his parents were Jewish, and therefore claimed a right to return under Israel's Law of Return. He also asked allegedly for two million dollars and a passport.

Nozette reached a plea bargain with prosecutors and pleaded guilty to a single count of espionage, as well as pleading guilty earlier to the charges of fraud and tax evasion. The prosecution of the fraud and tax evasion case was handled by Assistant U.S. Attorney Michael K. Atkinson from the Fraud and Public Corruption Section of the U.S. Attorney’s Office for the District of Columbia and Trial Attorney Kenneth C. Vert from the Department of Justice’s Tax Division. He was sentenced to thirteen years of prison. Held in custody since his arrest in 2009, Nozette received credit for the time he had already served. Nozette was released on November 13, 2020.

Nozette published his first novel The Day Of Infamy: Space Pearl Harbor in 2026, from Pegasus Publishing. The first book of a trilogy, these will be followed by his memoir, Cat's Paw.

== Honors ==
- NASA Exceptional Achievement Medal 1994 for his conception and execution of the Clementine mission
- National Space Society’s Space Pioneer Award for 1994
- Rotary National Award for Space Achievement
- National Space Club, Nelson P. Jackson Aerospace Memorial Award
- Aviation Week and Space Technology 1994 Aerospace Laurel Award for outstanding achievement in the field of Space
- 1995 Space Frontier Foundation Vision to Reality Award
- X-Prize Foundation New Spirit of St. Louis Award

== Selected publications ==
- Spudis, Paul D.; Bussey, B.; Lichtenberg, C.; Marinelli, B.; Nozette, S. (2005). "mini-SAR: An Imaging Radar for the Chandrayaan 1 Mission to the Moon". Lunar and Planetary Science Conference. 26: 1153.
- Nozette, Stewart; et al. (2001). "Integration of lunar polar remote-sensing data sets: Evidence for ice at the lunar south pole". Journal of Geophysical Research. 106 (E10): 23253–23266. Bibcode:2001JGR...10623253N. doi:10.1029/2000JE001417.
- Pettengill, G.H.; Ford, P.G.; Nozette, S. (1982). "Venus: Global Surface Radar Reflectivity". Science. 217 (4560): 640–642. Bibcode:1982Sci...217..640P. doi:10.1126/science.217.4560.640. PMID 17817535. S2CID 43709174.
- Nozette, Stewart; et al. (December 16, 1994). "The Clementine mission to the Moon". Science. 266 (5192): 1835–1839. Bibcode:1994Sci...266.1835N. doi:10.1126/science.266.5192.1835. PMID 17737076. S2CID 36702160.
- Nozette, Stewart; John S. Lewis (April 9, 1982). "Venus: Chemical Weathering of Igneous Rocks and Buffering of Atmospheric Composition". Science. 216 (4542): 181–183. Bibcode:1982Sci...216..181N. doi:10.1126/science.216.4542.181. PMID 17736250. S2CID 35760902.
- Nozette, S.; Boynton, W.V (October 16, 1981). "Superheavy Elements: An Early Solar System Upper Limit for Elements 107 to 110". Science. 214 (4518): 331–333. Bibcode:1981Sci...214..331N. doi:10.1126/science.214.4518.331. PMID 17829789. S2CID 40597320.
