= Mini-RF =

Small radar mapper on the Lunar Reconnaissance Orbiter

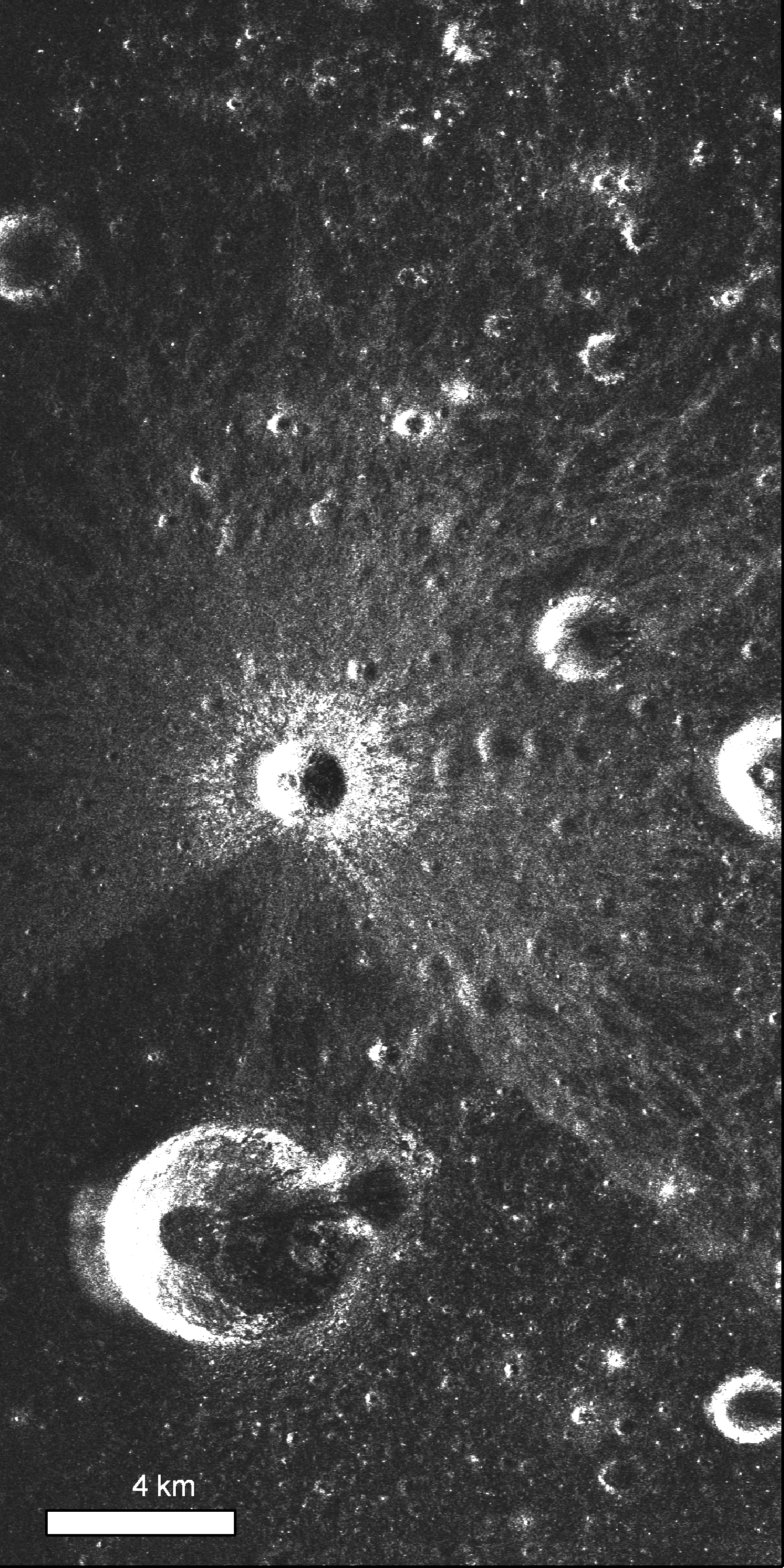
An example Mini-RF total radar backscatter image taken in the 12.6 cm band. It shows a fresh lunar impact crater with an ejecta blanket surrounding it.

The Miniature Radio-Frequency instrument (Mini-RF) is a synthetic aperture radar (SAR) instrument on the Lunar Reconnaissance Orbiter (LRO), which is currently in orbit around the Moon. It has a resolution of 30 m/pixel and two wavelength bands, a primary band at 12.6 cm and a secondary band at 4.2 cm.

== Overview ==
Previous SAR instruments, such as the radar on the Magellan mission to Venus, were large, massive, power-hungry, and expensive. Intended as a demonstration of cheap, lightweight SAR technology, the Mini-RF instrument was designed in response to these concerns. Because it was a technology demonstration, Mini-RF is sometimes not included in lists of LRO's instruments.

Radar is one of the few remote sensing tools capable of distinguishing water ice from other forms of water thought to be present of the Moon, such as hydrated minerals and water adsorbed onto the lunar surface. Although the LCROSS mission, which deliberately crashed a probe into the lunar surface to look for water, detected water in Cabeus Crater, Mini-RF did not detect the presence of thick deposits of water ice at the LCROSS impact site, however, the presence of less than 10 cm sized ice fragments could not be ruled out.

In January, 2011, after completion of Mini-RF's primary mission objectives, NASA announced that the Mini-RF transmitter had suffered a critical failure. The receiver continues working, allowing occasional bistatic radar measurements, where the radar signal is transmitted from the Earth, reflected off the Moon, and received by the Mini-RF.

== Controversy ==
The original principal investigator of Mini-RF, Stewart Nozette, was arrested for espionage. Nozette was replaced by Ben Bussey, then of APL, the Applied Physics Laboratory where Mini-RF was assembled from components developed by a consortium of industry team members. Bussey accepted a position at NASA Headquarters and was replaced by the current principal investigator, Wes Patterson, also of APL.
