= Lunar water =

Presence of water on the Moon

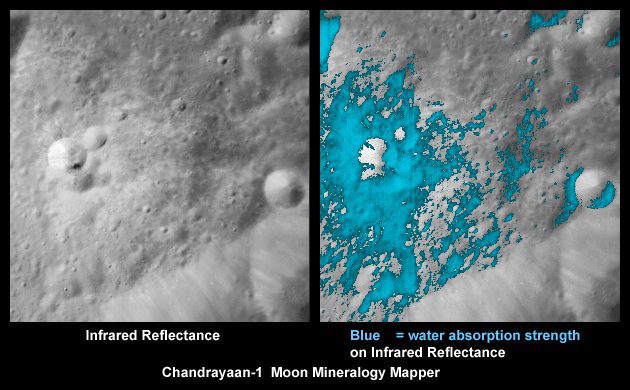
These false-color images show areas where water presence is indicated in a young lunar crater on the far side, as imaged by the Moon Mineralogy Mapper aboard Chandrayaan-1.

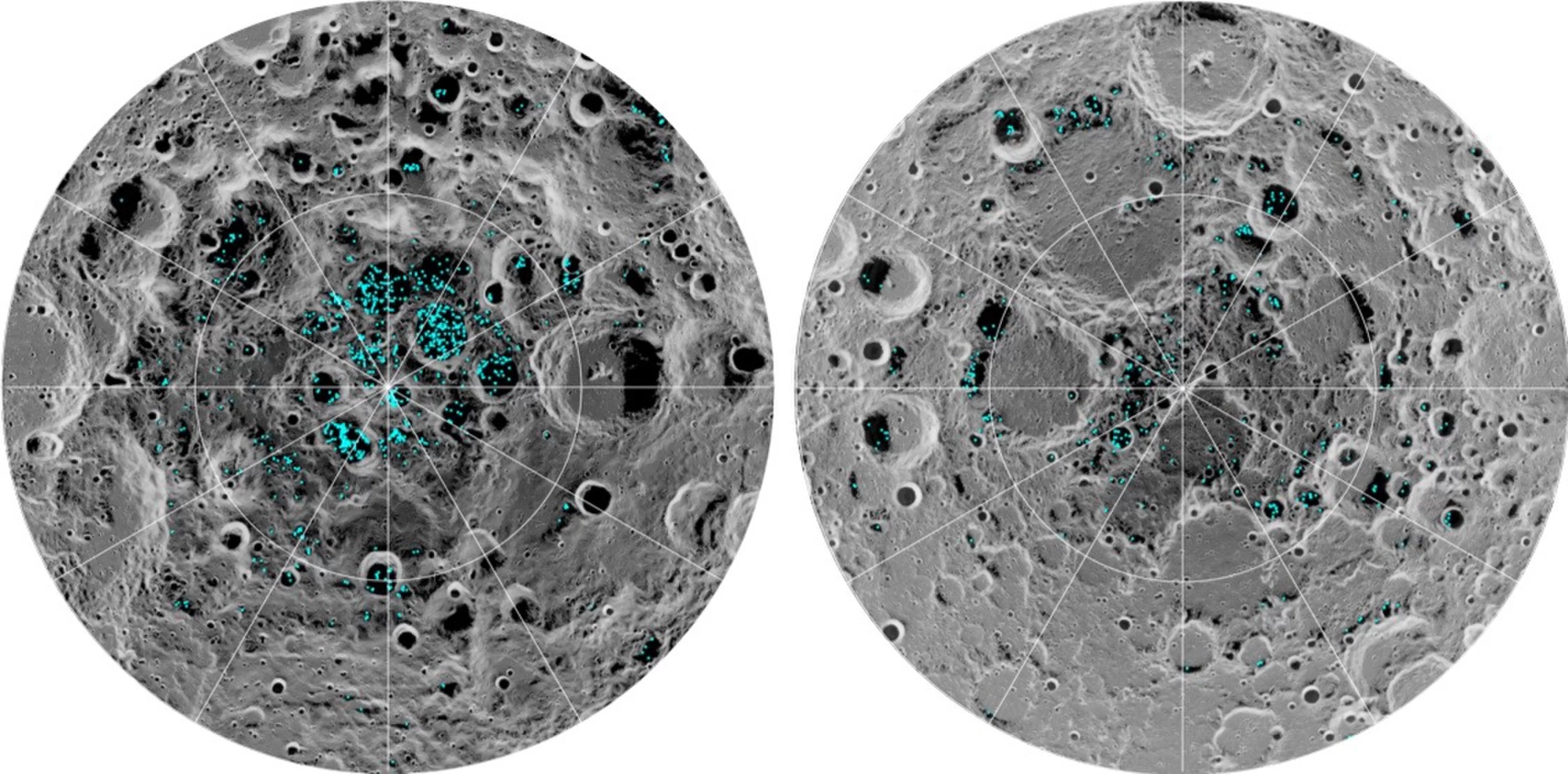
The image shows the distribution of surface ice at the Moon's south pole (left) and north pole (right) as viewed by NASA's Moon Mineralogy Mapper (M^{3}) spectrometer onboard India's Chandrayaan-1 orbiter

The search for the presence of water on the Moon has attracted considerable attention and motivated several recent lunar missions, largely because of water's usefulness in making long-term lunar habitation feasible.

The Moon was believed to be generally anhydrous after analysis of Apollo mission soil samples. It was understood that any water vapor on the surface would generally be decomposed by sunlight, leaving hydrogen and oxygen lost to outer space. However, subsequent robotic probes found evidence of water, especially of water ice in some permanently shadowed craters on the Moon. In 2018, water ice was confirmed in multiple locations. This water ice is not in the form of sheets of ice on the surface nor just under the surface, but there may be small (less than about 10 centimetres (3.9 in)) chunks of ice mixed into the regolith, and some water is chemically bonded with minerals. Other experiments have detected water molecules in the negligible lunar atmosphere, and even some in low concentrations at the Moon's sunlit surface.

On the Moon, water molecules (H_{2}O) and hydroxyl groups (-OH) are not present as free water but are chemically bonded within minerals as hydrates and hydroxides, existing in low concentrations across the lunar surface. Adsorbed water is estimated to be traceable at levels of 10 to 1000 ppm. The presence of water may be attributed to two primary sources: delivery over geological timescales via impacts and in situ production through interactions of solar wind hydrogen ions with oxygen-bearing minerals. Confirmed hydroxyl-bearing materials include glasses, apatite or Ca_{5}(PO_{4})_{3}(F, Cl, OH), and novograblenovite or (NH_{4})MgCl_{3}·_{6}H_{2}O.

== History of observations ==
=== 19th century and earlier ===
In the 16th century, Leonardo da Vinci in his Codex Leicester attempted to explain the luminosity of the Moon by assuming that the Moon's surface is covered by water, reflecting the Sun's light. In his model, waves on the water's surface cause the light to be reflected in many directions, explaining why the Moon is not as bright as the Sun.

In 1834–1836, Wilhelm Beer and Johann Heinrich Mädler published their four-volume Mappa Selenographica and the book Der Mond in 1837, which established the conclusion that the Moon has no bodies of water on the surface nor any appreciable atmosphere.

=== 20th century ===
The possibility of ice in the floors of polar lunar craters was first suggested in 1961 by Caltech researchers Kenneth Watson, Bruce C. Murray, and Harrison Brown.

Earth-based radar measurements were used to identify the areas that are in permanent shadow and hence have the potential to harbour lunar ice: Estimates of the total extent of shadowed areas poleward of 87.5 degrees latitude are 1,030 and 2,550 square kilometres (400 and 980 sq mi) for the north and south poles, respectively. Subsequent computer simulations encompassing additional terrain suggested that an area up to 14,000 square kilometres (5,400 sq mi) might be in permanent shadow.

==== Apollo program ====
Trace amounts of water were found in lunar rock samples collected by Apollo astronauts. This was initially assumed to be a result of contamination, and the majority of the lunar surface was generally assumed to be completely dry. However, a 2008 study of lunar rock samples revealed evidence of water molecules trapped in volcanic glass beads.

The first direct evidence of water vapor near the Moon was obtained by the Apollo 14 ALSEP Suprathermal Ion Detector Experiment, SIDE, on March 7, 1971. A series of bursts of water vapor ions were observed by the instrument mass spectrometer at the lunar surface near the Apollo 14 landing site.

==== Luna 24 ====
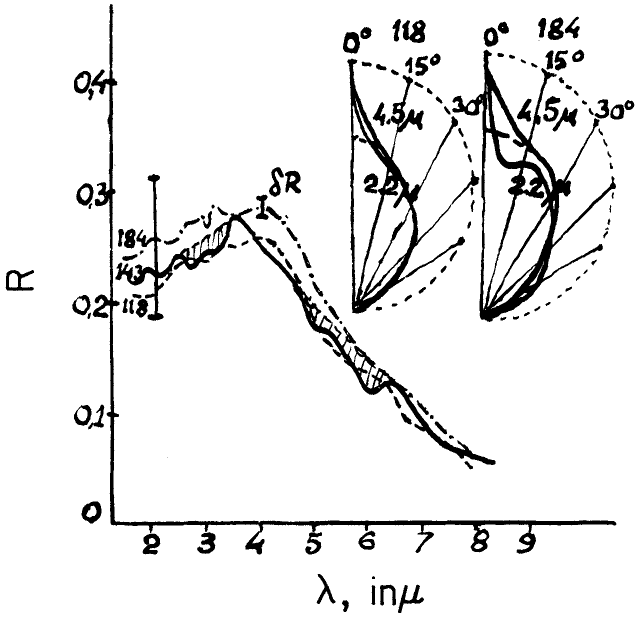
Diffuse reflection spectra of lunar regolith samples extracted at depths of 118 and 184 cm by the Soviet probe Luna 24 showing minima near 3, 5 and 6 μm, valence-vibration bands for water molecules.

On 18 August 1976, the Soviet Luna 24 probe landed at Mare Crisium, took samples from depths of 118, 143, and 184 cm of the lunar regolith, and returned them to Earth. In February 1978 Soviet scientists M. Akhmanova, B. Dement'ev, and M. Markov of the Vernadsky Institute of Geochemistry and Analytical Chemistry published a paper claiming a detection of water fairly definitively. Their study showed that the samples returned to Earth by the 1976 Soviet probe Luna 24 contained about 0.1% water by mass, as seen in infrared absorption spectroscopy (at about 3 μm (0.00012 in) wavelength), at a detection level about 10 times above the threshold, although Crotts points out that "The authors... were not willing to stake their reputations on an absolute statement that terrestrial contamination was completely avoided." This would represent the first direct measurement of water content on the surface of the moon, although that result has not been confirmed by other researchers.

==== Clementine ====
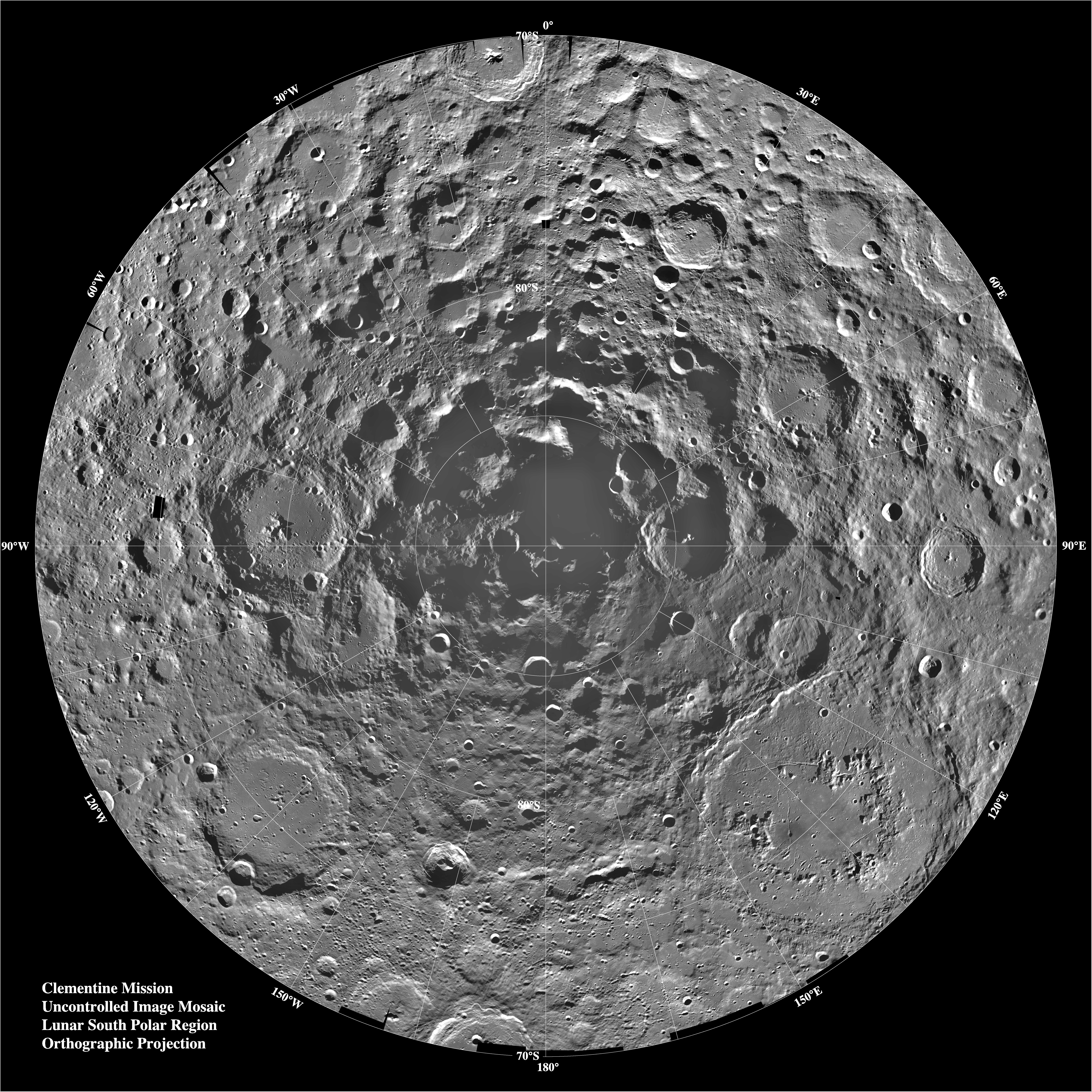
Composite image of the Moon's south polar region, captured by NASA's Clementine probe over two lunar days. Permanently shadowed areas could harbour water ice.

A proposed evidence of water ice on the Moon came in 1994 from the United States military Clementine probe. In an investigation known as the 'bistatic radar experiment', Clementine used its transmitter to beam radio waves into the dark regions of the south pole of the Moon. Echoes of these waves were detected by the large dish antennas of the Deep Space Network on Earth. The magnitude and polarisation of these echoes was consistent with an icy rather than rocky surface, but the results were inconclusive, and their significance has been questioned.

==== Lunar Prospector ====
The Lunar Prospector probe, launched in 1998, employed a neutron spectrometer to measure the amount of hydrogen in the lunar regolith near the polar regions. It was able to determine hydrogen abundance and location to within 50 parts per million and detected enhanced hydrogen concentrations at the lunar north and south poles. These were interpreted as indicating significant amounts of water ice trapped in permanently shadowed craters, but could also be due to the presence of the hydroxyl radical (^{•}OH) chemically bound to minerals. Based on data from Clementine and Lunar Prospector, NASA scientists have estimated that, if surface water ice is present, the total quantity could be of the order of 1–3 cubic kilometres (0.24–0.72 cu mi). In July 1999, at the end of its mission, the Lunar Prospector probe was deliberately crashed into Shoemaker crater, near the Moon's south pole, in the hope that detectable quantities of water would be liberated. However, spectroscopic observations from ground-based telescopes did not reveal the spectral signature of water.

=== 21st century ===
==== Deep Impact ====
In 2005, observations of the Moon by the Deep Impact spacecraft produced inconclusive spectroscopic data suggestive of water on the Moon. In 2006, observations with the Arecibo planetary radar showed that some of the near-polar Clementine radar returns, previously claimed to be indicative of ice, might instead be associated with rocks ejected from young craters. If true, this would indicate that the neutron results from Lunar Prospector were primarily from hydrogen in forms other than ice, such as trapped hydrogen molecules or organics. Nevertheless, the interpretation of the Arecibo data do not exclude the possibility of water ice in permanently shadowed craters. In June 2009, NASA's Deep Impact spacecraft, now redesignated EPOXI, made further confirmatory bound hydrogen measurements during another lunar flyby.

==== Kaguya ====
As part of its lunar mapping programme, Japan's Kaguya probe, launched in September 2007 for a 19-month mission, carried out gamma ray spectrometry observations from orbit that can measure the abundances of various elements on the Moon's surface. Japan's Kaguya probe's high resolution imaging sensors failed to detect any signs of water ice in permanently shaded craters around the south pole of the Moon, and it ended its mission by crashing into the lunar surface in order to study the ejecta plume content.

==== Chang'e 1 ====
The People's Republic of China's Chang'e 1 orbiter, launched in October 2007, took the first detailed photographs of some polar areas where ice water is likely to be found.

==== Chandrayaan-1 ====
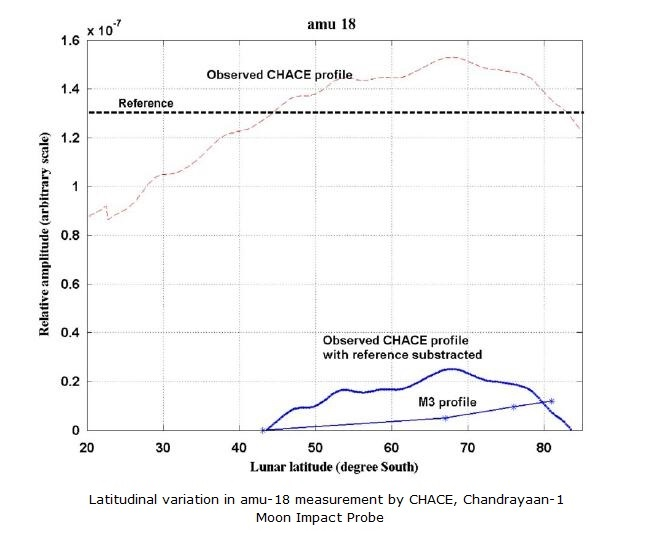
Direct evidence of lunar water in the Moon atmosphere obtained by the Chandrayaan-1's Altitudinal Composition (CHACE) output profile

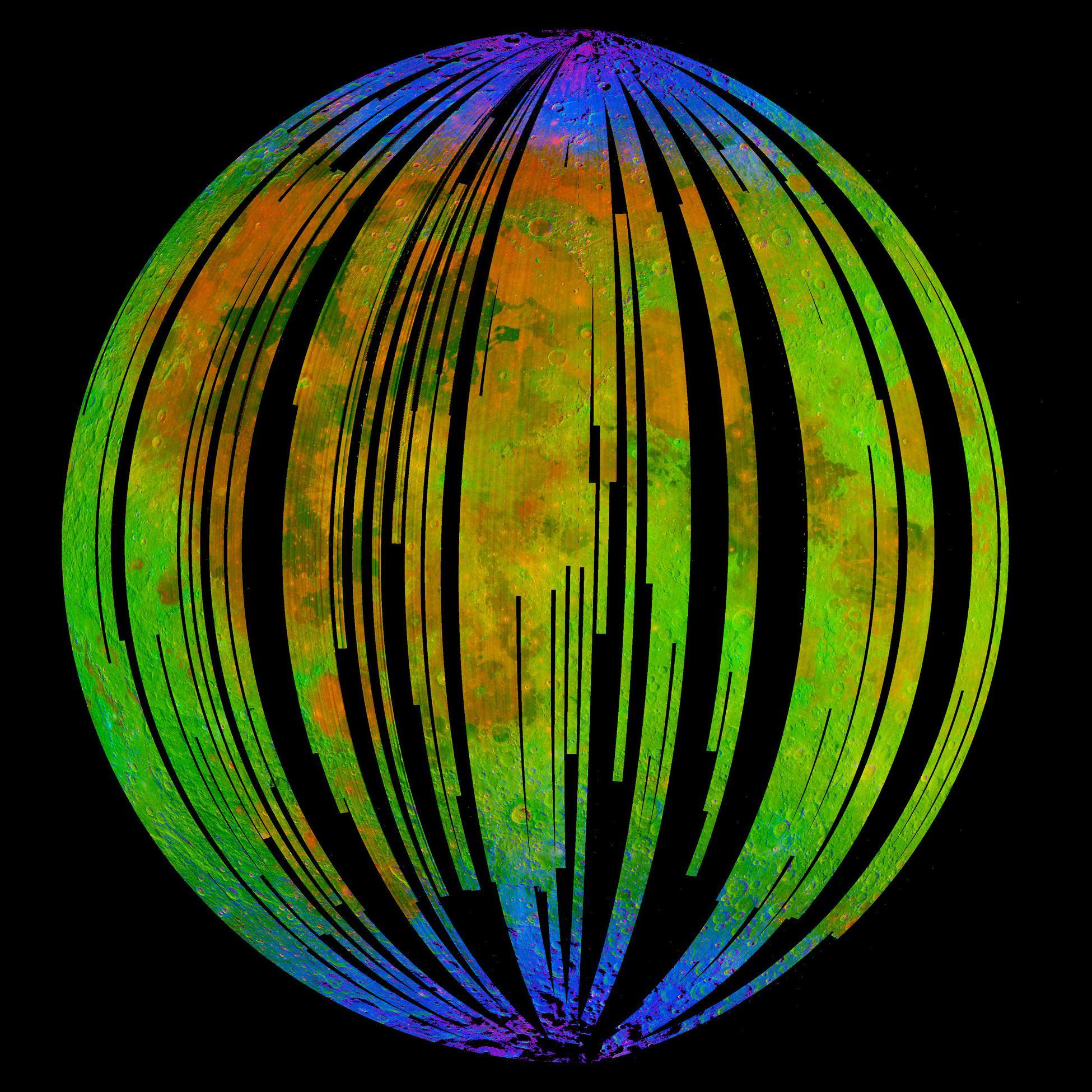
Image of the Moon taken by the Moon Mineralogy Mapper. Blue shows the spectral signature of hydroxide, green shows the brightness of the surface as measured by reflected infrared radiation from the Sun and red shows a mineral called pyroxene.

India's ISRO spacecraft Chandrayaan-1 released the Moon Impact Probe (MIP) that impacted Shackleton Crater, of the lunar south pole, at 20:31 on 14 November 2008 releasing subsurface debris that was analysed for presence of water ice. During its 25-minute descent, the impact probe's Chandra's Altitudinal Composition Explorer (CHACE) recorded evidence of water in 650 mass spectra gathered in the thin atmosphere above the Moon's surface and hydroxyl absorption lines in reflected sunlight.

On September 25, 2009, NASA declared that data sent from its M^{3} confirmed the existence of hydrogen over large areas of the Moon's surface, albeit in low concentrations and in the form of hydroxyl groups ( · OH) chemically bound to soil. This supports earlier evidence from spectrometers aboard the Deep Impact and Cassini probes. On the Moon, the feature is seen as a widely distributed absorption that appears strongest at cooler high latitudes and at several fresh feldspathic craters. The general lack of correlation of this feature in sunlit M^{3} data with neutron spectrometer H abundance data suggests that the formation and retention of OH and H_{2}O is an ongoing surficial process. OH/H_{2}O production processes may feed polar cold traps and make the lunar regolith a candidate source of volatiles for human exploration.

Although M^{3} results are consistent with recent findings of other NASA instruments onboard Chandrayaan-1, the discovered water molecules in the Moon's polar regions is not consistent with the presence of thick deposits of nearly pure water ice within a few meters of the lunar surface, but it does not rule out the presence of small (<~10 cm (3.9 in)), discrete pieces of ice mixed in with the regolith. Additional analysis with M^{3} published in 2018 had provided more direct evidence of water ice near the surface within 20° latitude of both poles. In addition to observing reflected light from the surface, scientists used M^{3}'s near-infrared absorption capabilities in the permanently shadowed areas of the polar regions to find absorption spectra consistent with ice. At the north pole region, the water ice is scattered in patches, while it is more concentrated in a single body around the south pole. Because these polar regions do not experience the high temperatures (greater than 373 Kelvin), it was postulated that the poles act as cold traps where vaporized water is collected on the Moon.

In March 2010, it was reported that the Mini-SAR on board Chandrayaan-1 had discovered more than 40 permanently darkened craters near the Moon's north pole that are hypothesized to contain an estimated 600 million metric tonnes of water ice. The radar's high circular polarization ratio (CPR) is not uniquely diagnostic of either roughness or ice; the science team must take into account the environment of the occurrences of high CPR signal to interpret its cause. The ice must be relatively pure and at least a couple of meters thick to give this signature. The estimated amount of water ice potentially present is comparable to the quantity estimated from the previous mission of Lunar Prospector's neutron data.

==== Lunar Reconnaissance Orbiter and Lunar Crater Observation and Sensing Satellite ====
Video generated from NASA's Lunar Reconnaissance Orbiter images showing areas of permanent shadow. Realistic shadows evolve through several months.

On October 9, 2009, the Centaur upper stage of the Lunar Reconnaissance Orbiter's Atlas V carrier rocket was directed to impact Cabeus crater at 11:31 UTC, followed shortly by the NASA's Lunar Crater Observation and Sensing Satellite (LCROSS) spacecraft that flew through the ejecta plume. LCROSS detected a significant amount of hydroxyl groups in the material thrown up from a south polar crater by an impactor; this may be attributed to water-bearing materials – what appears to be "near pure crystalline water-ice" mixed in the regolith. What was actually detected was the chemical group hydroxyl ( · OH), which is suspected to be from water, but could also be hydrates, which are inorganic salts containing chemically bound water molecules. The nature, concentration and distribution of this material requires further analysis; chief mission scientist Anthony Colaprete has stated that the ejecta appears to include a range of fine-grained particulates of near pure crystalline water-ice. A later definitive analysis found the concentration of water to be "5.6 ± 2.9% by mass".

The Mini-RF instrument on board the Lunar Reconnaissance Orbiter (LRO) observed the plume of debris from the impact of the LCROSS orbiter, and it was concluded that the water ice must be in the form of small (< ~10 cm), discrete pieces of ice distributed throughout the regolith, or as thin coating on ice grains. This, coupled with monostatic radar observations, suggest that the water ice present in the permanently shadowed regions of lunar polar craters is unlikely to be present in the form of thick, pure ice deposits.

The data acquired by the Lunar Exploration Neutron Detector (LEND) instrument onboard LRO show several regions where the epithermal neutron flux from the surface is suppressed, which is indicative of enhanced hydrogen content. Further analysis of LEND data suggests that water content in the polar regions is not directly determined by the illumination conditions of the surface, as illuminated and shadowed regions do not manifest any significant difference in the estimated water content. According to the observations by this instrument alone, "the permanent low surface temperature of the cold traps is not a necessary and sufficient condition for enhancement of water content in the regolith".

LRO laser altimeter's examination of the Shackleton crater at the lunar south pole suggests up to 22% of the surface of that crater is covered in ice.

==== Melt inclusions in Apollo 17 samples ====
In May 2011, Erik Hauri et al. reported 615-1410 ppm water in melt inclusions in lunar sample 74220, the famous high-titanium "orange glass soil" of volcanic origin collected during the Apollo 17 mission in 1972. The inclusions were formed during explosive eruptions on the Moon approximately 3.7 billion years ago.

This concentration is comparable with that of magma in Earth's upper mantle. While of considerable selenological interest, this announcement affords little comfort to would-be lunar colonists. The sample originated many kilometers below the surface, and the inclusions are so difficult to access that it took 39 years to detect them with a state-of-the-art ion microprobe instrument.

==== Stratospheric Observatory for Infrared Astronomy ====
In October 2020, astronomers reported detecting molecular water on the sunlit surface of the Moon by several independent scientific teams, including the Stratospheric Observatory for Infrared Astronomy (SOFIA). The estimated abundance is about 100 to 400 ppm, with a distribution over a small latitude range, likely a result of local geology and not a global phenomenon. It was suggested that the detected water is stored within glasses or in voids between grains sheltered from the harsh lunar environment, thus allowing the water to remain on the lunar surface. Using data from the Lunar Reconnaissance Orbiter, it was shown that besides the large, permanently shadowed regions in the Moon's polar regions, there are many unmapped cold traps, substantially augmenting the areas where ice may accumulate. Approximately 10–20% of the permanent cold-trap area for water is found to be contained in "micro cold traps" found in shadows on scales from 1 km to 1 cm, for a total area of ~40,000 km^{2}, about 60% of which is in the South, and a majority of cold traps for water ice are found at latitudes >80° due to permanent shadows. "This discovery reveals that water might be distributed across the lunar surface and not limited to the cold shadowed places near the lunar poles," Paul Hertz, the director of NASA's astrophysics division, said of the SOFIA research.

==== Lunar IceCube ====
Lunar IceCube was a 6U (six unit) CubeSat that was to estimate amount and composition of lunar ice, using an infrared imaging spectrometer developed by NASA's Goddard Space Flight Center. The spacecraft separated from Artemis 1 successfully on November 17, 2022, but failed to communicate shortly thereafter and was presumed lost.

==== PRIME-1 ====
The Polar Resources Ice Mining Experiment 1 (PRIME-1) was launched on February 26, 2025 with the goal of demonstrating sample extraction and spectroscopy on the lunar South Pole with a particular focus on water content. Complications from landing meant sample extraction and analysis were not completed.

==== Lunar Trailblazer ====
The Lunar Trailblazer satellite launched in February 2025 as part of NASA's Small Innovative Missions for Planetary Exploration (SIMPLEx) program. The satellite carried two instruments—a high-resolution spectrometer, which would detect and map different forms of water, and a thermal mapper. The mission's primary objectives were to characterize the form of lunar water, how much is present and where; determine how lunar volatiles change and move over time; measure how much and what form of water exists in permanently shadowed regions of the Moon; and to assess how differences in the reflectivity and temperature of lunar surfaces affect the concentration of lunar water. NASA lost contact with the satellite shortly after launch and ended the mission in July 2025.

==== Chang'e-5 probe ====
Measurements on 117 individual spherical glass beads returned from the near side of the Moon by Chang'e 5 revealed a concentration of 0–1,909 μg/g of H_{2}O, equivalent to 2.7 × 10^{14} kg of trapped water on the lunar surface pointing to a new mechanism for storing water on the lunar surface. The findings could be useful for future lunar missions by identifying glasses as a potential resources that could be converted to drinking water or rocket fuel. Another unusual hydroxyl-bearing mineral was discovered in the Chang'e 5 regolith, novograblenovite (NH_{4})MgCl_{3}·_{6}H_{2}O. On Earth, this mineral has been identified around fumaroles and hydrothermal activity.

==== Chandrayaan-2 ====
A study by scientists from PRL and IISER in 2026 postulated that water ice deposits in the Moon's south polar regions, where craters remain in almost constant darkness and temperatures plunge below 160 °C, are far more stable than previously believed, offering a major boost to future human exploration plans such as the planned Chandrayaan Human landing attempt and NASA's Artemis Program as this may have allowed water deposits to sit accumulated and undisturbed for prehaps billions of years. The study involved high-resolution orbital imagery and impact modelling from Chandrayaan-2's OHRC instrument and Danuri's Shadowcam databases, with the research team mapping millions of tiny craters, ranging from one to 20 metres in size, across locations on the moon between 85° and 90° south latitude. The study found that small scale impact events were fairly uncommon in this region, with over 74% of permanently shadowed regions remaining largely undisturbed by such impacts.

== Possible water cycle ==
=== Composition and volatile-bearing materials ===
==== Meteoritic input ====
The composition of lunar water is not yet fully understood and is primarily inferred through remote sensing techniques. The lunar surface is significantly shaped by meteoritic impacts and likely contains a range of minerals that could harbor hydroxyls. These include hydrated and sulfur-bearing minerals such as epsomite, blödite, gypsum/bassanite, and jarosite. Lunar water may not be pure; instead, it could potentially be a brine, water with dissolved salts and other volatiles. These brines could form from or coexist with minerals delivered by carbonaceous chondrites and CI/CM chondrites, which bring hydrous minerals and potentially soluble compounds to the Moon. Micrometeorites and interplanetary dust particles contribute additional volatile compounds such as H_{2}O, CO, and possibly CO_{2} and impact the lunar surface with a flux of 1 impact per m^{2} per day. Furthermore, the potential presence of subsurface brines on larger celestial bodies like Ceres highlights the possibility of similar ices on the Moon.

==== Observations ====
Data from the Lunar Crater Observation and Sensing Satellite (LCROSS) confirmed a variety of volatiles in the lunar regolith including water (H_{2}O), hydrogen (H_{2}), carbon monoxide (CO), hydrogen sulfide (H_{2}S), ammonia (NH_{3}), sulfur dioxide (SO_{2}), ethylene (C_{2}H_{4}), carbon dioxide (CO_{2}), methanol (CH_{3}OH), mercury (Hg), and methane (CH_{4}).

==== Confirmed materials ====
Confirmed hydroxyl-bearing lunar materials include glasses, apatite, and novograblenovite (NH_{4})MgCl_{3}·_{6}H_{2}O.

Upon analyzing China's Chang'e 5 return sample, scientists have identified an unknown mineral (dubbed ULM-1) from a lunar sunlit area, in which water makes up over 40% of the mineral sample by mass.

=== Production ===
Lunar water has several potential origins: the Earth, water-bearing comets (and other bodies) striking the Moon, and in situ production. It has been theorized that the latter may occur when hydrogen ions (protons) in the solar wind chemically combine with the oxygen atoms present in the lunar minerals (oxides, silicates, etc.) to produce small amounts of water trapped in the minerals' crystal lattices or as hydroxyl groups, potential water precursors. (This mineral-bound water, or mineral surface, must not be confused with water ice.)

The hydroxyl surface groups (X–OH) formed by the reaction of protons (H^{+}) with oxygen atoms accessible at oxide surface (X=O) could further be converted in water molecules (H_{2}O) adsorbed onto the oxide mineral's surface. The mass balance of a chemical rearrangement supposed at the oxide surface could be schematically written as follows:

2 X–OH → X=O + X + H_{2}O

or,

2 X–OH → X–O–X + H_{2}O

where "X" represents the oxide surface.

The formation of one water molecule requires the presence of two adjacent hydroxyl groups or a cascade of successive reactions of one oxygen atom with two protons. This could constitute a limiting factor and decreases the probability of water production if the proton density per surface unit is too low.

=== Trapping ===
NASA simulation of the lunar south pole illumination in 2025 in steps of 2 hours – teal rings are in steps of 2° ≈ 60.6 km (37.7 mi)

Solar radiation would normally strip any free water or water ice from the lunar surface, splitting it into its constituent elements, hydrogen and oxygen, which then escape to space. However, because of the only very slight axial tilt of the Moon's spin axis to the ecliptic plane (1.5 °), some deep craters near the poles never receive any sunlight, and are permanently shadowed (see, for example, Shackleton crater, and Whipple crater). The temperature in these regions never rises above about 100 K (about −170 ° Celsius), and any water that eventually ended up in these craters could remain frozen and stable for extremely long periods of time — perhaps billions of years, depending on the stability of the orientation of the Moon's axis.

While the ice deposits may be thick, they are most likely mixed with the regolith, possibly in a layered formation.

Impact glass beads could store and release water, possibly storing as much as 270 billion tonnes of water.

=== Transport ===
Although free water cannot persist in illuminated regions of the Moon, any such water produced there by the action of the solar wind on lunar minerals might, through a process of evaporation and condensation, migrate to permanently cold polar areas and accumulate there as ice, perhaps in addition to any ice brought by comet impacts.

The hypothetical mechanism of water transport / trapping (if any) remains unknown: indeed lunar surfaces directly exposed to the solar wind where water production occurs are too hot to allow trapping by water condensation (and solar radiation also continuously decomposes water), while no (or much less) water production is expected in the cold areas not directly exposed to the Sun. Given the expected short lifetime of water molecules in illuminated regions, a short transport distance would in principle increase the probability of trapping. In other words, water molecules produced close to a cold, dark polar crater should have the highest probability of surviving and being trapped.

To what extent, and at what spatial scale, direct proton exchange (protolysis) and proton surface diffusion directly occurring at the naked surface of oxyhydroxide minerals exposed to space vacuum (see surface diffusion and self-ionization of water) could also play a role in the mechanism of the water transfer towards the coldest point is presently unknown and remains a conjecture.

Simulations of lunar thermal conditions show that diurnal temperature variations could drive centimeter-scale water migration and accumulation in the Moon's subsurface.

LADEE data shows that the shock waves from impact events cause water beneath the surface to evaporate.

== Liquid water ==
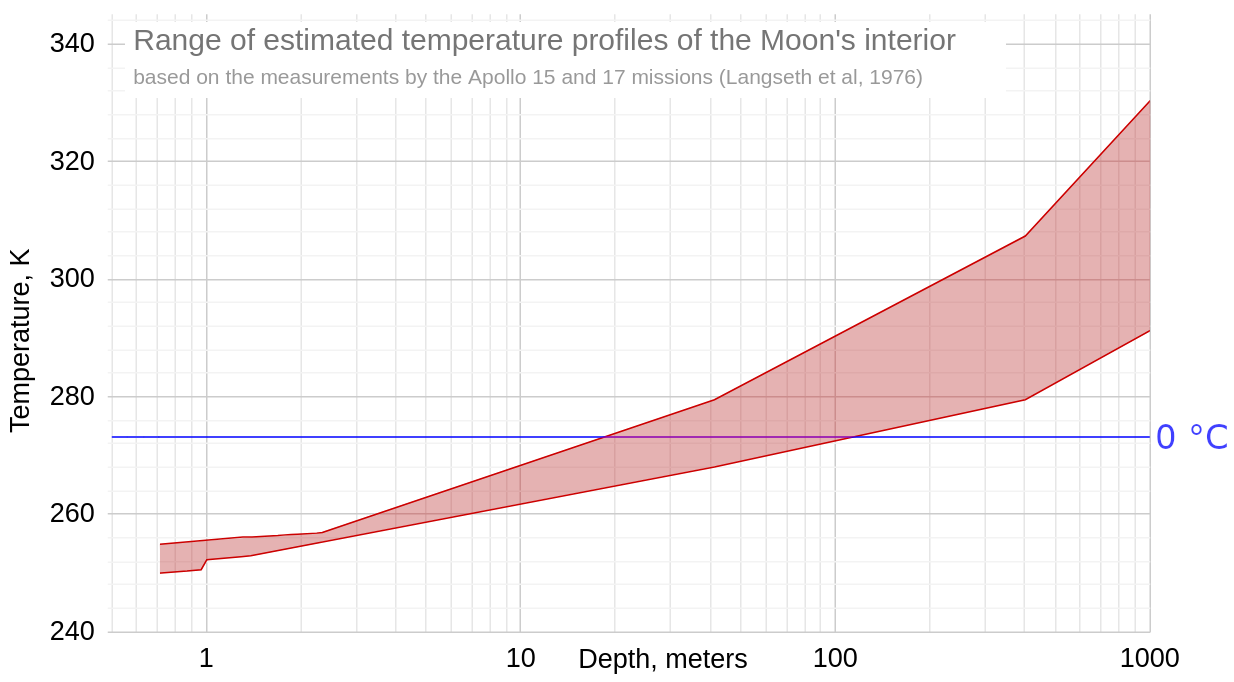
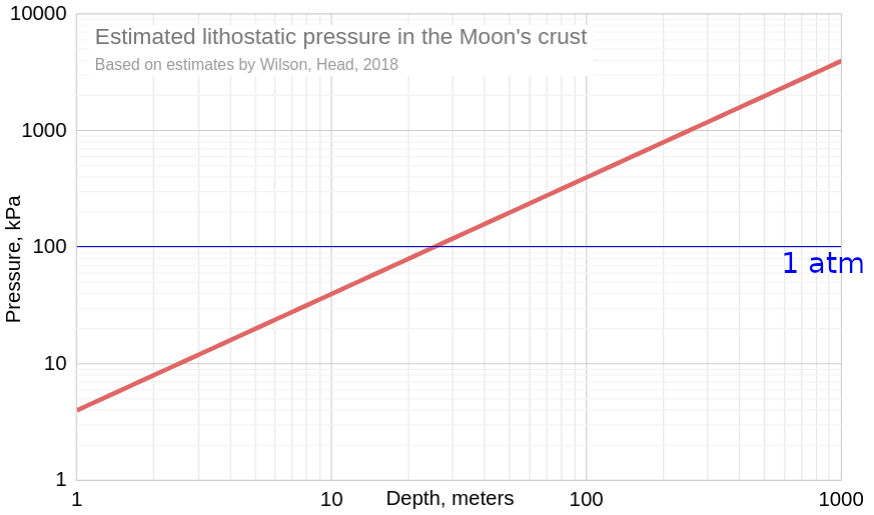
The temperature and pressure of the Moon's interior increase with depth

4–3.5 billion years ago, the Moon could have had sufficient atmosphere and liquid water on its surface. Isotope analysis of water in lunar samples suggests that some lunar water originates from Earth, possibly due to the Giant Impact event.

Warm and pressurized regions in the Moon's interior might still contain liquid water. Underground lakes of liquid water on the Moon require a reservoir of underground water, a source of heat, and a barrier sufficient to stop the water from being lost to space. Subsurface ice layers may block the diffusion of deeper liquid water, so subterranean "lakes" could be present underneath a region with surface or subsurface ice.

== Uses ==
Scientists have discovered that water is being released from the Moon during meteor showers. The video features additional narration from the LADEE mission and an extended interview with scientist Mehdi Benna.

The presence of large quantities of water on the Moon would be an important factor in rendering lunar habitation cost-effective since transporting water (or hydrogen and oxygen) from Earth would be prohibitively expensive. If future investigations find the quantities to be particularly large, water ice could be mined to provide liquid water for drinking and plant propagation, and the water could also be split into hydrogen and oxygen by solar panel-equipped electric power stations or a nuclear generator, providing breathable oxygen as well as the components of rocket fuel. The hydrogen component of the water ice could also be used to draw out the oxides in the lunar soil and harvest even more oxygen. Analysis of lunar ice would also provide scientific information about the impact history of the Moon and the abundance of comets and asteroids in the early Inner Solar System. Estimates of how far lunar water would go are more limited. A 2026 analysis by astrophysicists Martin Elvis and Jonathan McDowell found that the roughly one billion tonnes of water that may be present in the permanently shadowed regions near the poles would support a population of one million for only about a century at the 98% recycling achieved on the International Space Station, and concluded that large-scale long-term habitation would need recycling about ten times better or much larger water supplies.

== Ownership ==
The hypothetical discovery of usable quantities of water on the Moon may raise legal questions about who owns the water and who has the right to exploit it. The United Nations Outer Space Treaty does not prevent the exploitation of lunar resources, but does prevent the appropriation of the Moon by individual nations and is generally interpreted as barring countries from claiming ownership of lunar resources. However most legal experts agree that the ultimate test of the question will arise through precedents of national or private activity.

The Moon Treaty specifically stipulates that exploitation of lunar resources is to be governed by an "international regime", but that treaty has only been ratified by a few nations, and primarily those with no independent spaceflight capabilities.

Luxembourg and the US have granted their citizens the right to mine and own space resources, including the resources of the Moon. US President Donald Trump expressly stated that in his executive order of 6 April 2020.

== See also ==
- In situ resource utilization
- Lunar resources
- Water on Mars

Missions mapping lunar water

- Chandrayaan-1 lunar orbiter
- Chandrayaan-2 lunar orbiter and rover
- Lunar Flashlight solar sail orbiter
- Lunar IceCube lunar orbiter
- LunaH-Map lunar obiter
- Lunar Reconnaissance Orbiter
