= Lunar Reconnaissance Orbiter =

NASA robotic spacecraft orbiting the moon

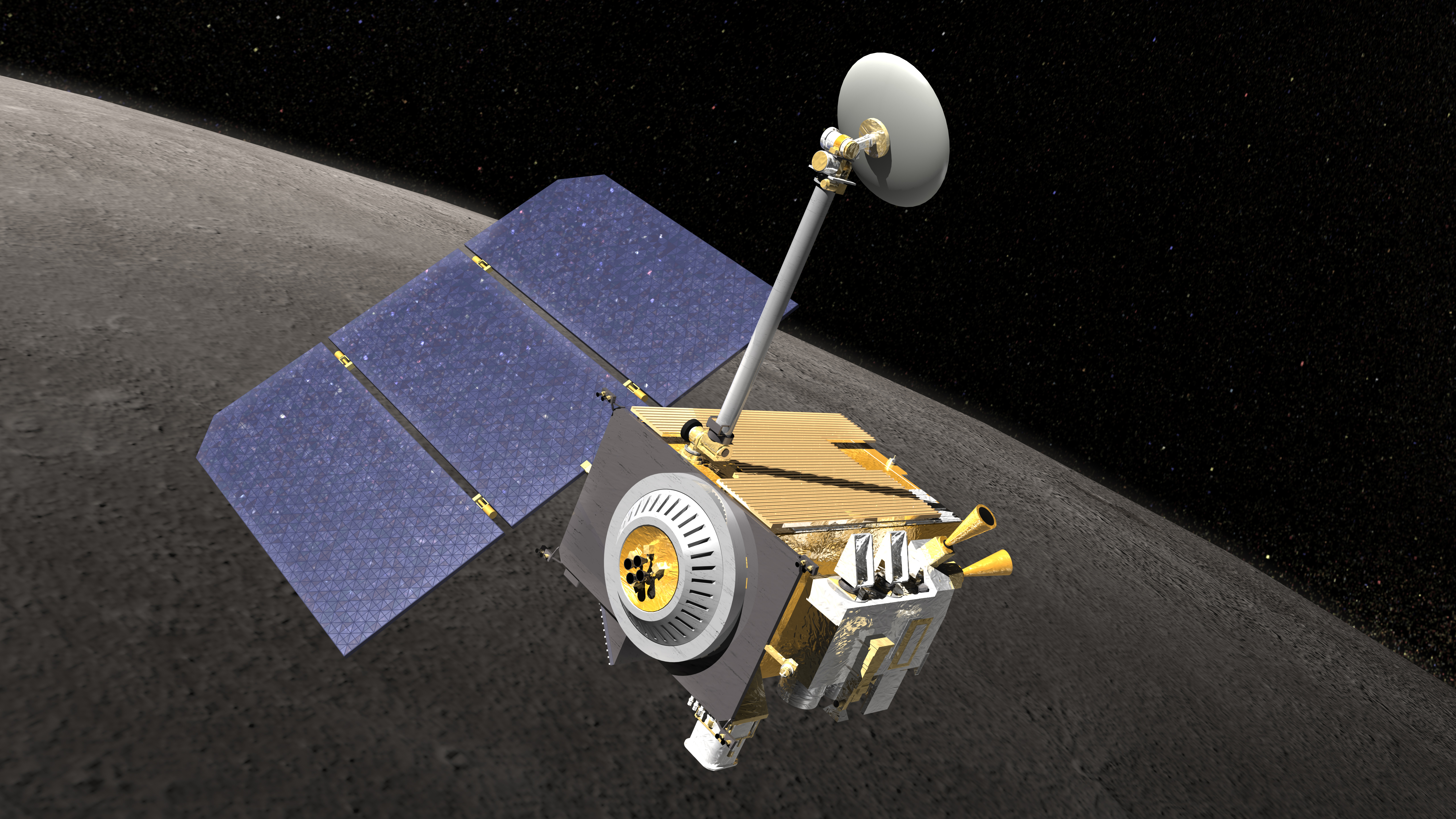
- Illustration of LRO
- Mission type: Lunar orbiter
- Operator: NASA
- COSPAR ID: 2009-031A
- SATCAT no.: 35315
- Website: lunar.gsfc.nasa.gov
- Mission duration: Primary mission: 1 year; Science mission: 2 years; Extension 1: 2 years; Extension 2: 2 years; Elapsed: 17 years, 5 months

Spacecraft properties
- Manufacturer: NASA / GSFC
- Launch mass: 1,916 kg (4,224 lb)
- Dry mass: 1,018 kg (2,244 lb)
- Payload mass: 92.6 kg (204 lb)
- Dimensions: Launch: 390 × 270 × 260 cm (152 × 108 × 103 in)
- Power: 1850 W

Start of mission
- Launch date: June 18, 2009, 21:32:00 UTC
- Rocket: Atlas V 401
- Launch site: Cape Canaveral SLC-41
- Contractor: United Launch Alliance
- Entered service: September 15, 2009; 17 years ago

Orbital parameters
- Reference system: Selenocentric
- Semi-major axis: 1,825 km (1,134 mi)
- Periselene altitude: 20 km (12 mi)
- Aposelene altitude: 165 km (103 mi)
- Epoch: May 4, 2015

Moon orbiter
- Orbital insertion: June 23, 2009
Instruments
- CRaTER: Cosmic Ray Telescope for the Effects of Radiation
- DLRE: Diviner Lunar Radiometer Experiment
- LAMP: Lyman-Alpha Mapping Project
- LEND: Lunar Exploration Neutron Detector
- LOLA: Lunar Orbiter Laser Altimeter
- LROC: Lunar Reconnaissance Orbiter Camera
- Mini-RF: Miniature Radio Frequency
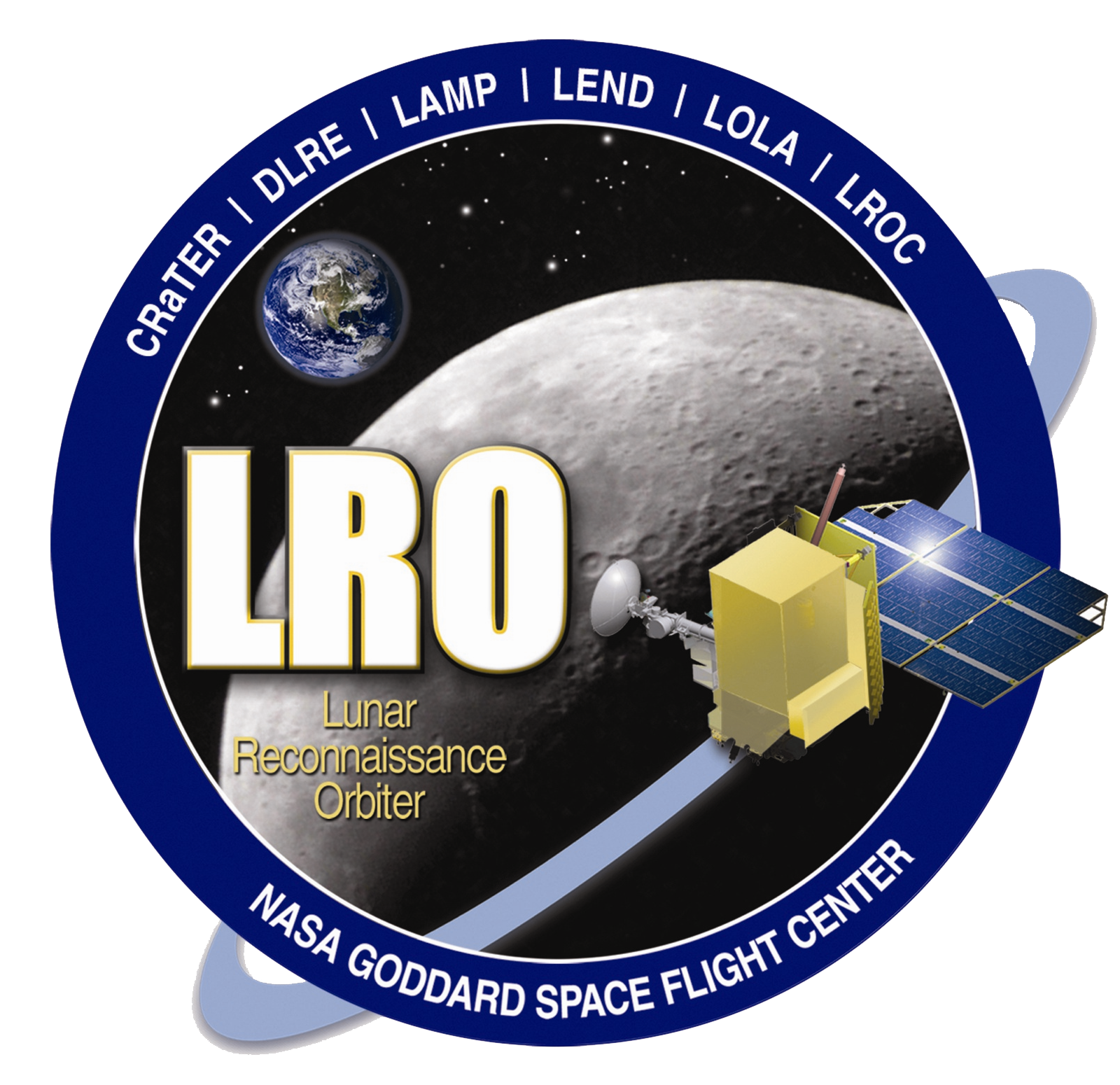

The Lunar Reconnaissance Orbiter (LRO) is a NASA robotic spacecraft currently orbiting the Moon in an eccentric polar mapping orbit. Data collected by LRO have been described as essential for planning NASA's future human and robotic missions to the Moon. Its detailed mapping program is identifying safe landing sites, locating potential resources on the Moon, characterizing the radiation environment, and demonstrating new technologies.

Launched on June 18, 2009, in conjunction with the Lunar Crater Observation and Sensing Satellite (LCROSS), as the vanguard of NASA's Lunar Precursor Robotic Program, LRO was the first United States mission to the Moon in over ten years. LRO and LCROSS were launched as part of the United States's Vision for Space Exploration program.

The probe has made a 3-D map of the Moon's surface at 100-meter resolution and 98.2% coverage (excluding polar areas in deep shadow), including 0.5-meter resolution images of Apollo landing sites. The first images from LRO were published on July 2, 2009, showing a region in the lunar highlands south of Mare Nubium (Sea of Clouds).

The total cost of the mission is reported as US$583 million, of which $504 million pertains to the main LRO probe and $79 million to the LCROSS satellite. LRO has enough fuel to continue operations until 2027.

== Mission ==
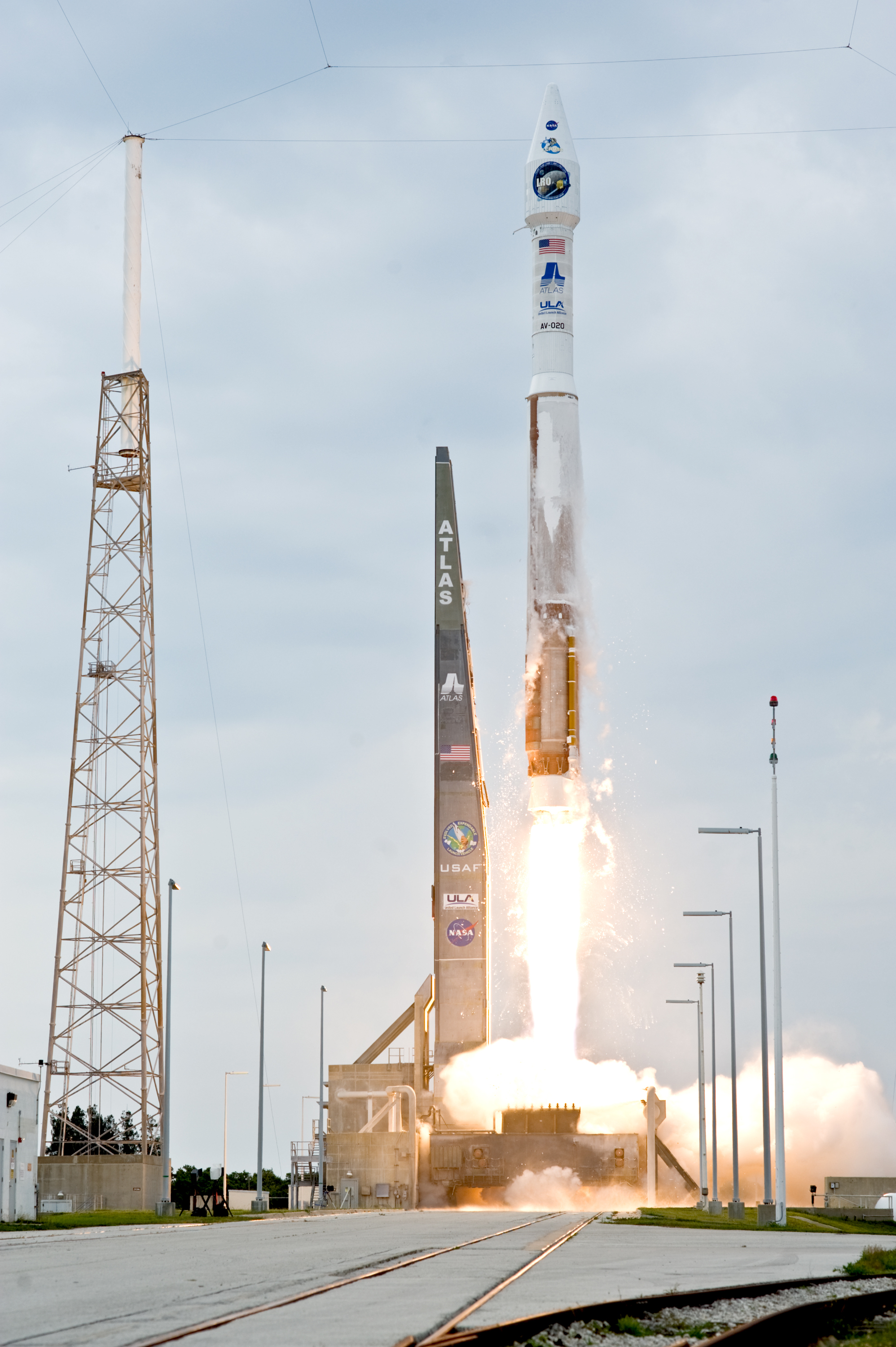
Atlas V carrying LRO and LCROSS

Developed at NASA's Goddard Space Flight Center, LRO is a large (1,916 kg/4,224 lb) and sophisticated spacecraft. Its mission duration was planned for one year, but has since been extended numerous times after review by NASA.

After completing a preliminary design review in February 2006 and a critical design review in November 2006, the LRO was shipped from Goddard to Cape Canaveral Air Force Station on February 11, 2009. Launch was planned for October 2008, but this slid to April as the spacecraft underwent testing in a thermal vacuum chamber. Launch was rescheduled for June 17, 2009, because of the delay in a priority military launch, and happened one day later, on June 18. The one-day delay was to allow the Space Shuttle Endeavour a chance to lift off for mission STS-127 following a hydrogen fuel leak that canceled an earlier planned launch.

Areas of investigation include selenodetic global topography; the lunar polar regions, including possible water ice deposits and the lighting environment; characterization of deep space radiation in lunar orbit; and high-resolution mapping, at a maximum resolution of 50 cm/pixel (20 in/pixel), to assist in the selection and characterization of future landing sites.

In addition, LRO has provided images and precise locations of landers and equipment from previous and current lunar missions, including the Apollo sites. In 2024, it confirmed the highly accurate landing site of the first successful Japanese SLIM soft landing.

== Instruments ==
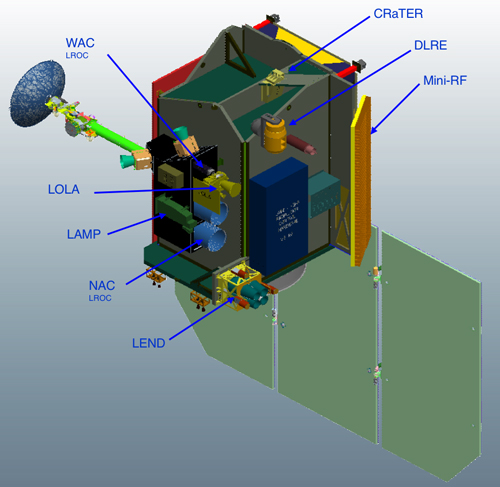
Onboard instruments

The orbiter carries a complement of six instruments and one technology demonstration:

Cosmic Ray Telescope for the Effects of Radiation (CRaTER)
The primary goal of the Cosmic Ray Telescope for the Effects of Radiation is to measure and characterize local energy transfer by charged particles in lunar orbit and its biological impacts.
Diviner
The Diviner Lunar Radiometer Experiment measures lunar surface thermal emission to provide information for future surface operations and exploration.
Lyman-Alpha Mapping Project (LAMP)
The Lyman-Alpha Mapping Project peers into permanently shadowed craters in search of water ice, using ultraviolet light generated by stars as well as the hydrogen atoms that are thinly spread throughout the Solar System.
Lunar Exploration Neutron Detector (LEND)
The Lunar Exploration Neutron Detector provides measurements, creates maps, and detects possible near-surface water ice deposits.
Lunar Orbiter Laser Altimeter (LOLA)
The Lunar Orbiter Laser Altimeter investigation provides a precise global lunar topographic model and geodetic grid.

Lunar Reconnaissance Orbiter Camera (LROC) Narrow Angle Camera (NAC)
The Lunar Reconnaissance Orbiter Camera addresses the measurement requirements of landing site certification and polar illumination. LROC comprises a pair of narrow-angle cameras (NAC) and a single wide-angle camera (WAC). The two Narrow Angle Cameras feature a Cassegrain (Ritchey-Chretien) primary optics at f/3.59, with primary mirror diameter of 19.5 cm, using push-broom imaging. At its original altitude of about 50 km, each NAC images pixels about 0.5-meter across, and the swath, which is 5064 pixels wide, is about 2.5 km across. The orbit was raised in 2011 to be elliptical, reducing the resolution in parts of the orbit to 2.0 m/px.: LROC has flown several times over the historic Apollo lunar landing sites at 50 km (31 mi) altitude. The Lunar Roving Vehicles and Lunar Module descent stages and their respective shadows are clearly visible, along with other equipment previously left on the Moon.
Lunar Reconnaissance Orbiter Camera (LROC) Wide Angle Camera (WAC)
The WAC provides visible and UV images at a scale of 100 meters/pixel in seven color bands over a 60 km swath. Image format is 1024 x 1024 pixels, with a field of view of 92° (monochrome), 61° (visible light), and 59° in the UV.
Mini-RF
The Miniature Radio Frequency radar demonstrated new lightweight synthetic aperture radar (SAR) and communications technologies and located potential water-ice.

== Names to the Moon ==
Prior to the LRO's launch, NASA gave members of the public the opportunity to have their names placed in a microchip on the LRO. The deadline for this opportunity was July 31, 2008. About 1.6 million names were submitted.

== Mission progress ==
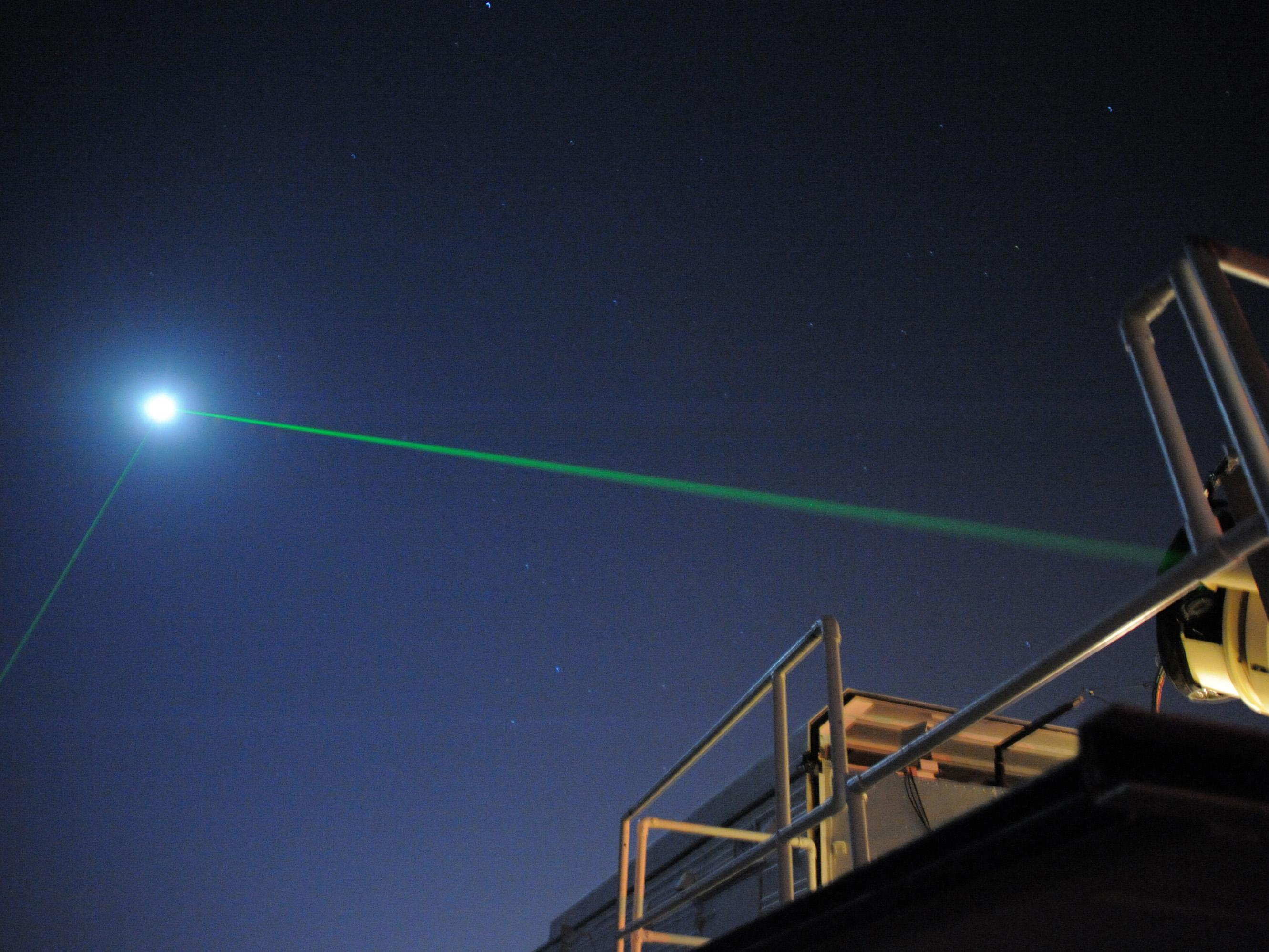
In this image, the lower of the two green beams is from the Lunar Reconnaissance Orbiter's dedicated tracker.

Animation of LRO trajectory around Earth Lunar Reconnaissance Orbiter · Earth · Moon

Animation of LRO's trajectory from June 23, 2009, to June 30, 2009 LRO · Moon

On June 23, 2009, the Lunar Reconnaissance Orbiter entered into orbit around the Moon after a four-and-a-half-day journey from the Earth. When launched, the spacecraft was aimed at a point ahead of the Moon's position. A mid-course correction was required during the trip in order for the spacecraft to correctly enter Lunar orbit. Once the spacecraft reached the far side of the Moon, its rocket motor was fired in order for it to be captured by the Moon's gravity into an elliptical lunar orbit.

A series of four rocket burns over the next four days put the satellite into its commissioning phase orbit where each instrument was brought online and tested. On September 15, 2009, the spacecraft started its primary mission by orbiting the Moon at about 50 km (31 mi) for one year. After completing its one-year exploration phase, in September 2010, LRO was handed over to NASA's Science Mission Directorate to continue the science phase of the mission. It would continue in its 50 km circular orbit, but eventually would be transitioned into a fuel-conserving "quasi-frozen" elliptical orbit for the remainder of the mission.

NASA's LCROSS mission culminated with two lunar impacts at 11:31 and 11:36 UTC on October 9. The goal of the impact was the search for water in the Cabeus crater near the Moon's south pole, and preliminary results indicated the presence of both water and hydroxyl, an ion related to water.

On January 4, 2011, the Mini-RF instrument team for the Lunar Reconnaissance Orbiter (LRO) found that the Mini-RF radar transmitter had suffered an anomaly. Mini-RF has suspended normal operations. Despite being unable to transmit, the instrument is being used to collect bistatic radar observations using radar transmissions from the Earth. The Mini-RF instrument has already met its science mission success criteria by collecting more than 400 strips of radar data since September 2010.

In January 2013, NASA tested one-way laser communication with LRO by sending an image of the Mona Lisa to the Lunar Orbiter Laser Altimeter (LOLA) instrument on LRO from the Next Generation Satellite Laser Ranging (NGSLR) station at NASA's Goddard Space Flight Center in Greenbelt, Maryland.

In May 2015, LRO's orbit was altered to fly 20 km (12 mi) above the Moon's south pole, allowing higher resolution data to be obtained from the Lunar Orbiter Laser Altimeter (LOLA) and Diviner instruments over the permanently shadowed craters there.

In 2019, LRO found the crash site of Indian moon lander Vikram.

In 2020, software was tested to use star trackers instead of the Miniature Inertial Measurement Unit that had been turned off in 2018 (as it was degrading).

LRO and the Chandrayaan-2 orbiter were expected to come dangerously close to each other on 20 October 2021 at 05:45 UTC over the Lunar North pole. Chandrayaan-2 orbiter performed a collision avoidance manoeuvre at 14:52 UTC on 18 October 2021 to avert the possible conjunction event.

== Results ==
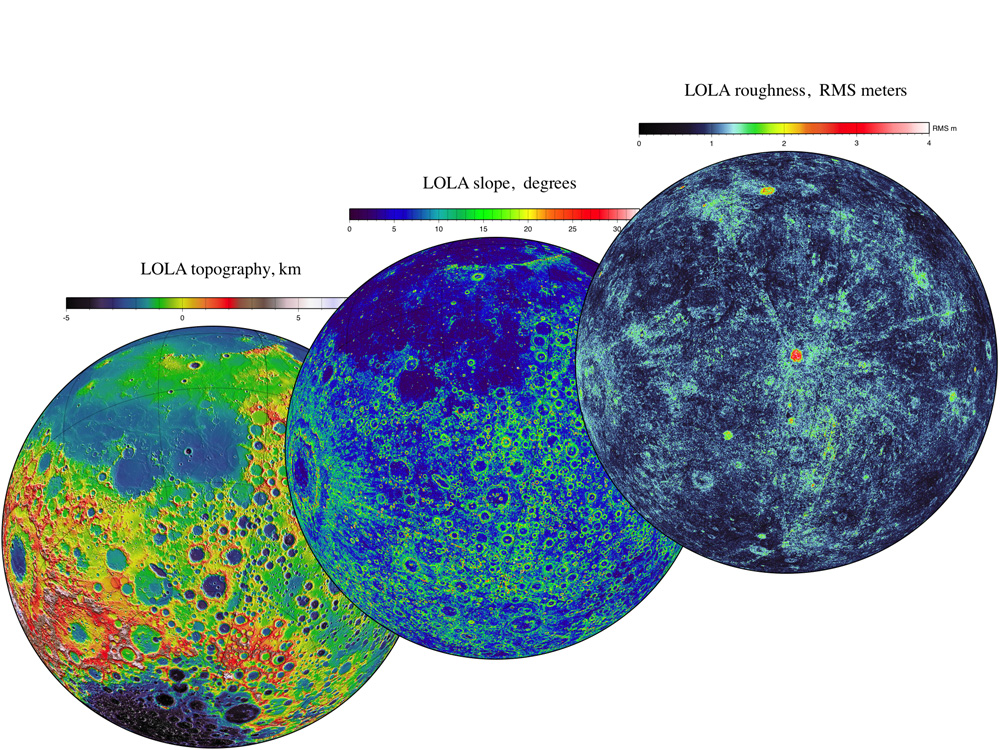
LOLA data provides three complementary views of the near side of the Moon: the topography (left) along with maps of the surface slope values (middle) and the roughness of the topography (right). All three views are centered on the relatively young impact crater Tycho, with the Orientale basin on the left side.

On August 21, 2009, the spacecraft, along with the Chandrayaan-1 orbiter, attempted to perform a bistatic radar experiment to detect the presence of water ice on the lunar surface, but the test was unsuccessful.

On December 17, 2010, a topographic map of the Moon based on data gathered by the LOLA instrument was released to the public. This is the most accurate topographic map of the Moon to date. It will continue to be updated as more data is acquired.

On March 15, 2011, the final set of data from the exploration phase of the mission was released to the NASA Planetary Data System. The spacecraft's seven instruments delivered more than 192 terabytes of data. LRO has already collected as much data as all other planetary missions combined. This volume of data is possible because the Moon is so close, LRO has its own dedicated ground station, and it doesn't have to share time on the Deep Space Network. Among the latest products is a global map with a resolution of 100 m/pixel (330 ft/pixel) from the Lunar Reconnaissance Orbiter Camera (LROC).

In March 2015, the LROC team reported having imaged the location of an impact whose flash was observed from Earth on March 17, 2013. The team found the crater by going back to images taken in the first year or two and comparing them to images taken after the impact, called temporal pairs. The images revealed splotches, small areas whose reflectance is markedly different from that of the surrounding terrain, presumably from disruption of the surface by recent impacts.

By September 2015, LROC had imaged nearly three-fourths of the lunar surface at high resolution, revealing more than 3,000 lobate scarps. Their global distribution and orientation suggests that the faults are created as the Moon shrinks, with influence by gravitational tidal forces from Earth.

In March 2016, the LROC team reported the use of 14,092 NAC temporal pairs to discover over 47,000 new splotches on the Moon.

In July 2024, the analysis of the radar data obtained by LRO confirmed the presence of an underground cave on the Moon accessible from the surface. The cave is said to be about 45 metres wide and at least 80 metres long, and present in the Mare Tranquillitatis (Sea of Tranquility), the ancient lava plain where the Apollo 11 astronauts Neil Armstrong and Buzz Aldrin first set foot on the Moon.

In September 2026, researchers reported findings on the McGetchin crater, a 222-metre (728 ft) impact crater on the Moon’s near side that LRO imaged in May 2024.

The mission maintains a full list of publications with science results on its website.

== Gallery ==
Lunar Reconnaissance Orbiter mission photos

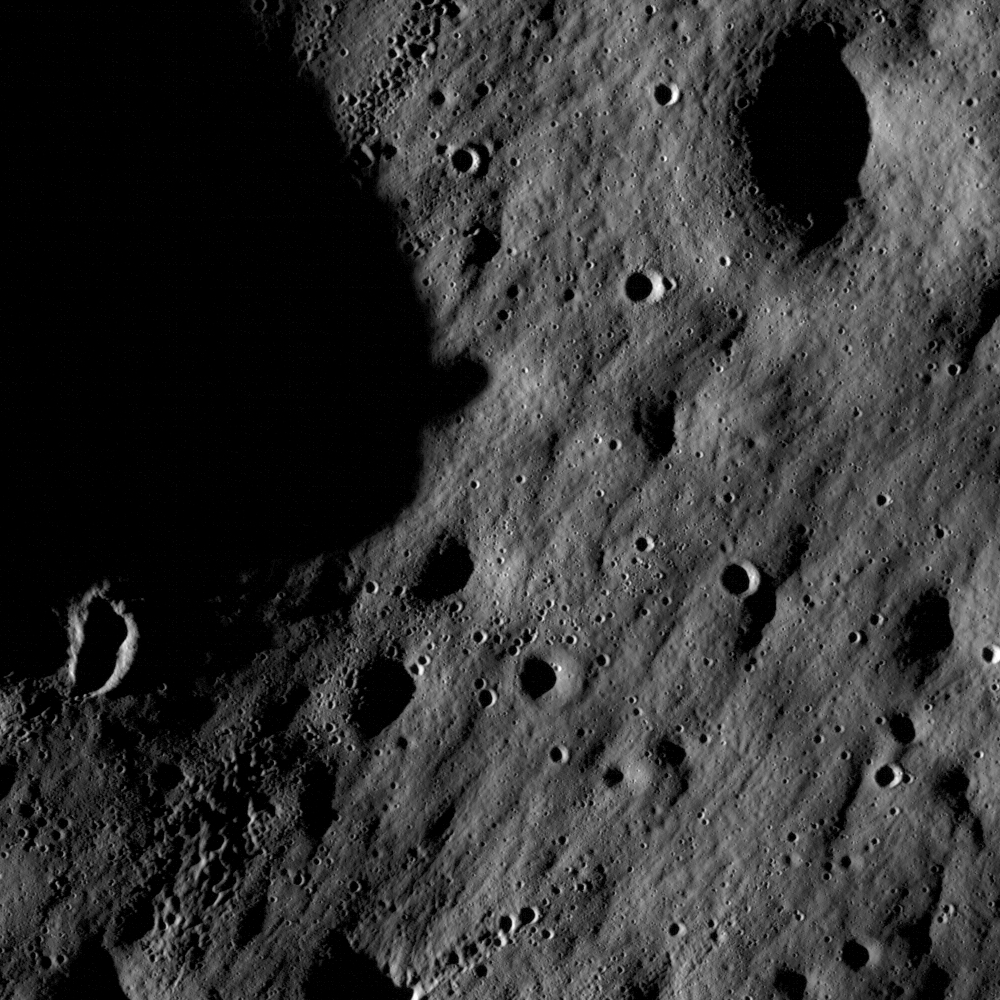
First LRO image (June 30, 2009)

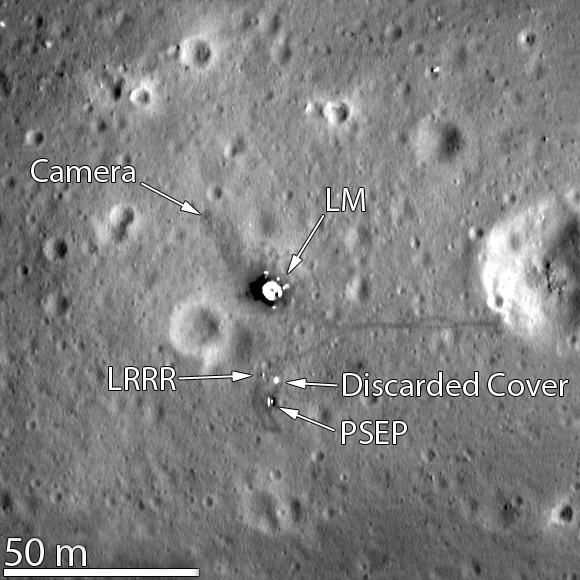
Apollo 11 landing site

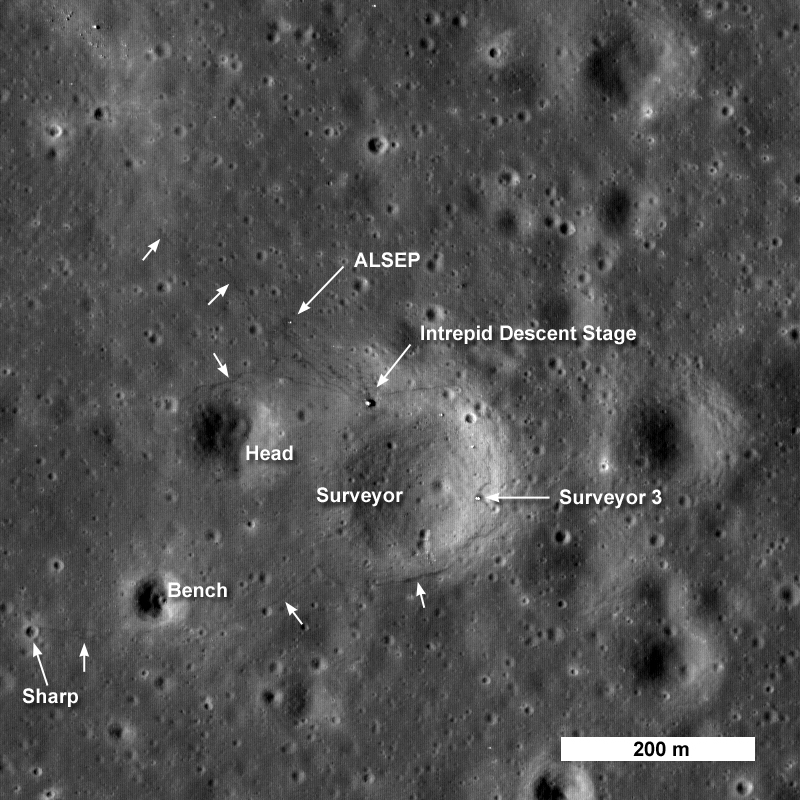
Apollo 12 and Surveyor 3 landing site

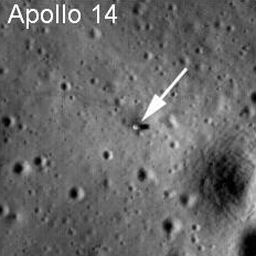
Apollo 14 landing site

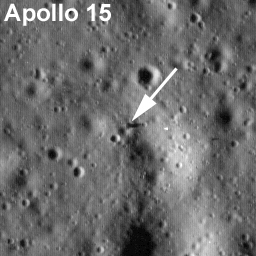
Apollo 15 landing site

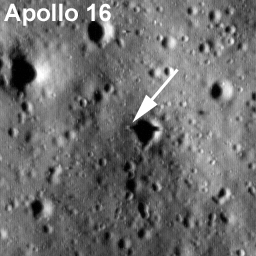
Apollo 16 landing site

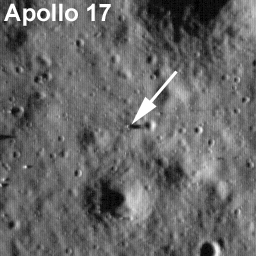
Apollo 17 landing site

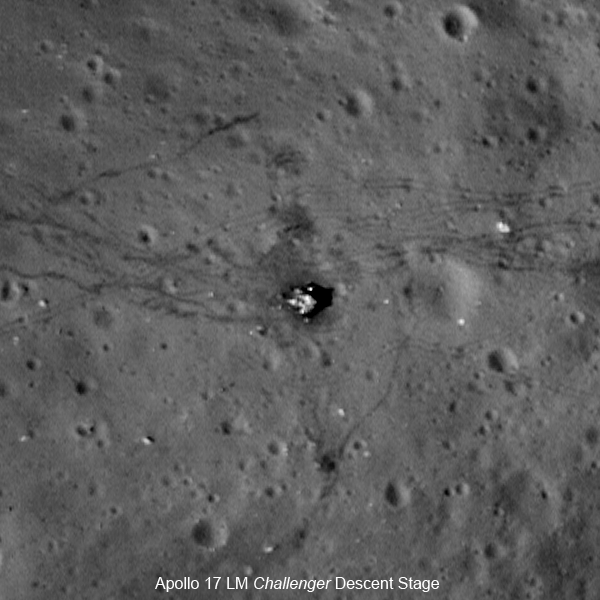
Close up of Apollo 17 Challenger descent stage

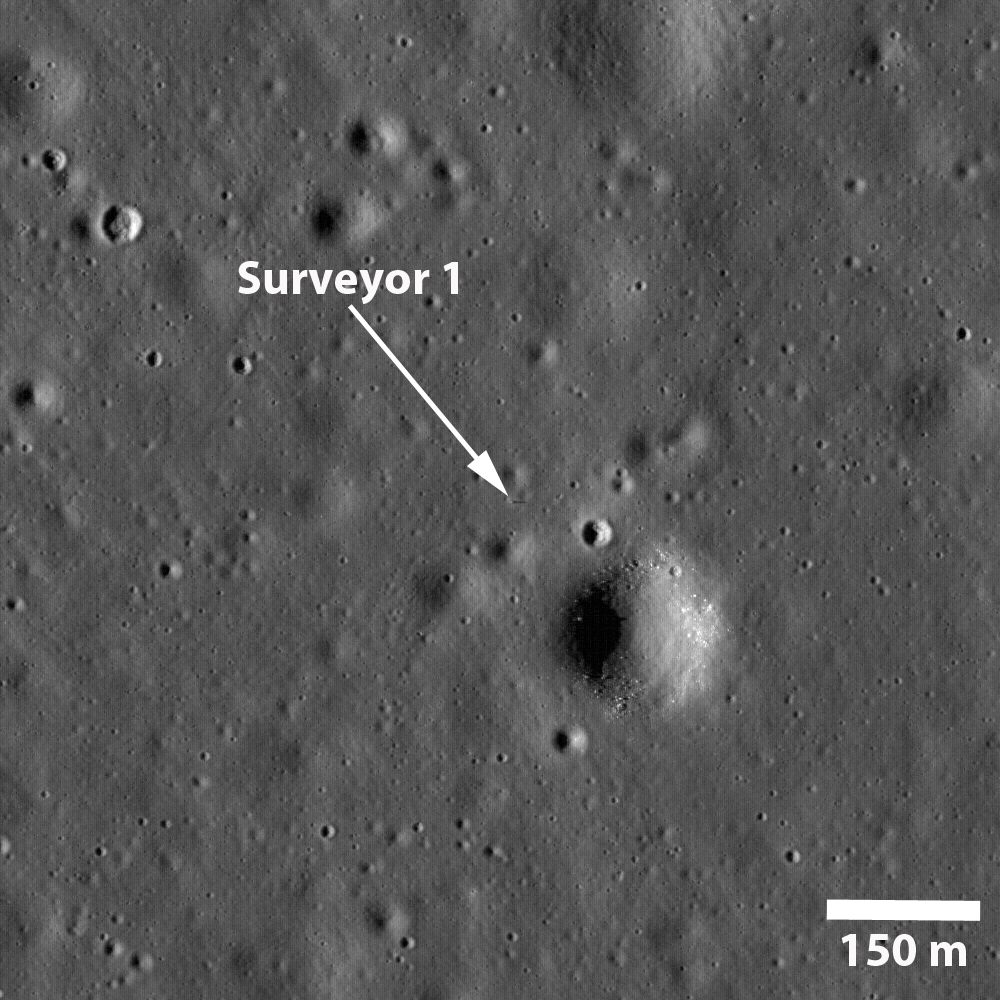
Surveyor 1 landing site

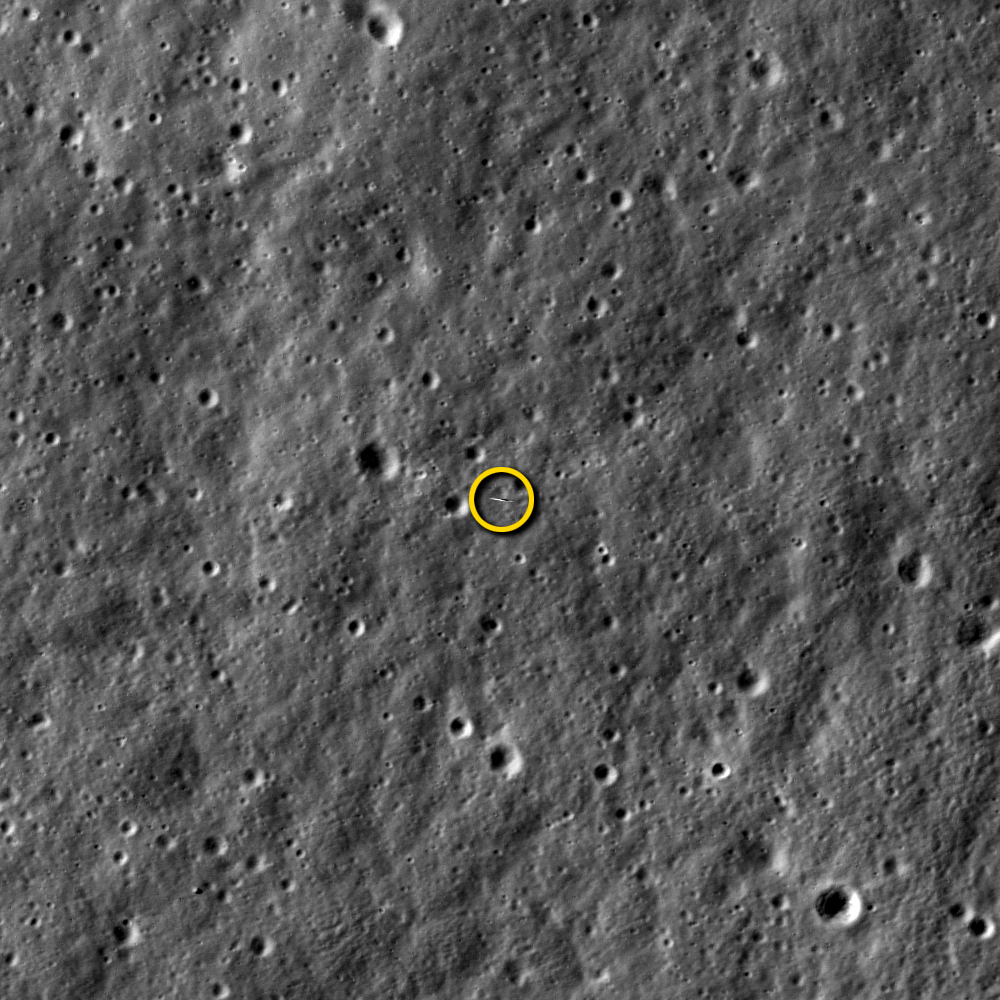
LRO views LADEE at a distance of 9 km (5.6 mi)

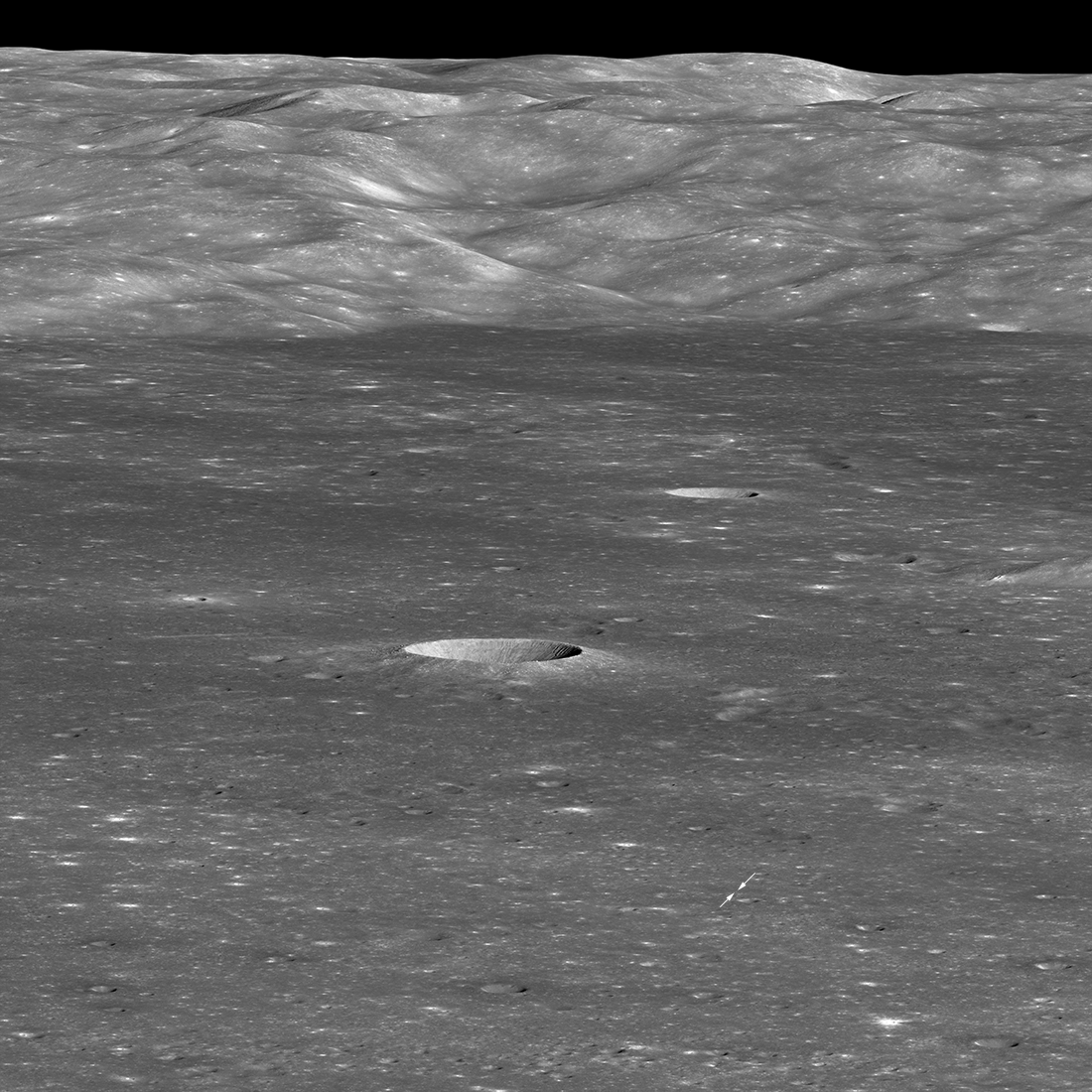
Chang'e 4 landing site

LRO views the Vikram lander crash site.

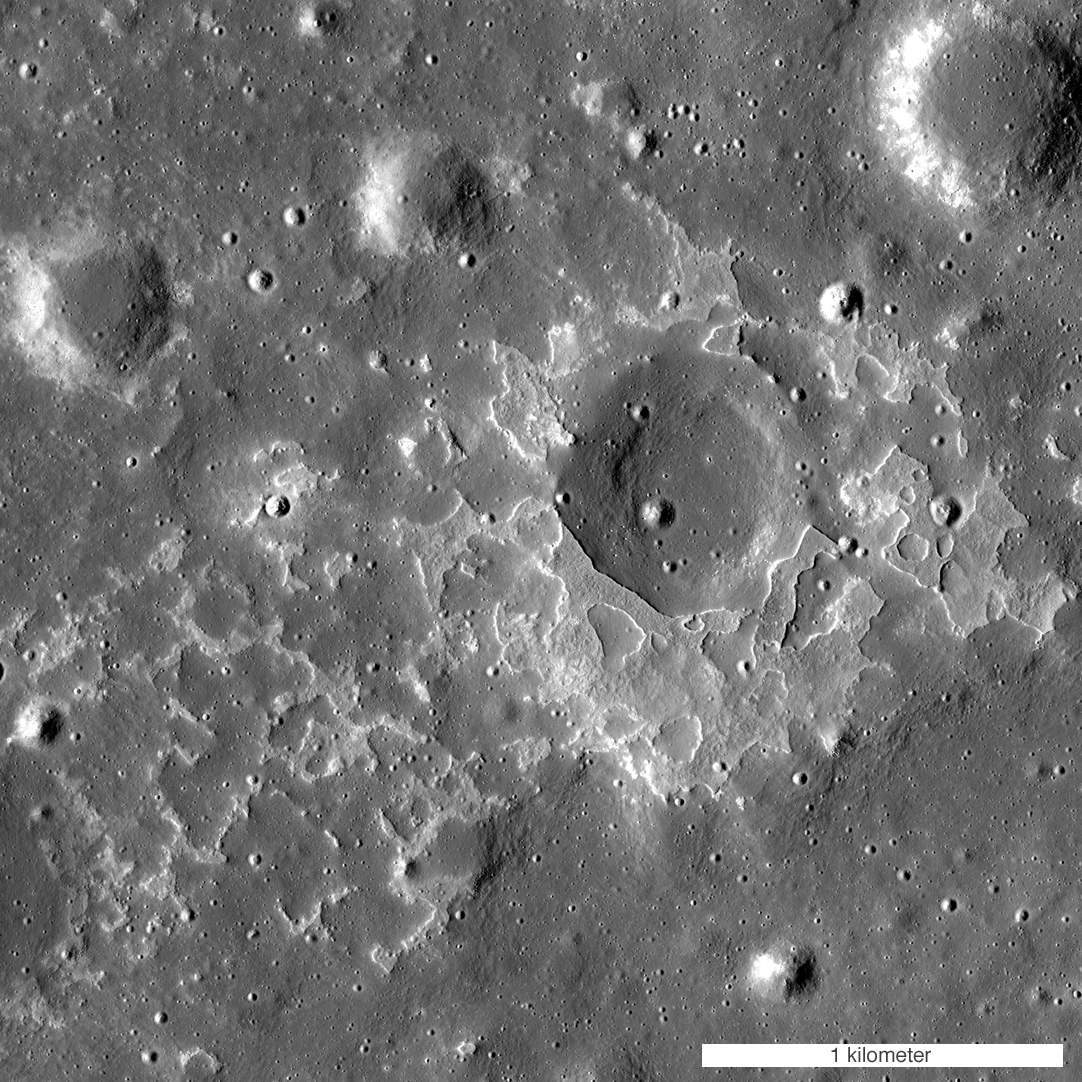
LRO view of irregular mare patch, an extremely young terrain

Earthrise over Compton crater
The Moon

Lunar near side

Lunar far side

Lunar north pole

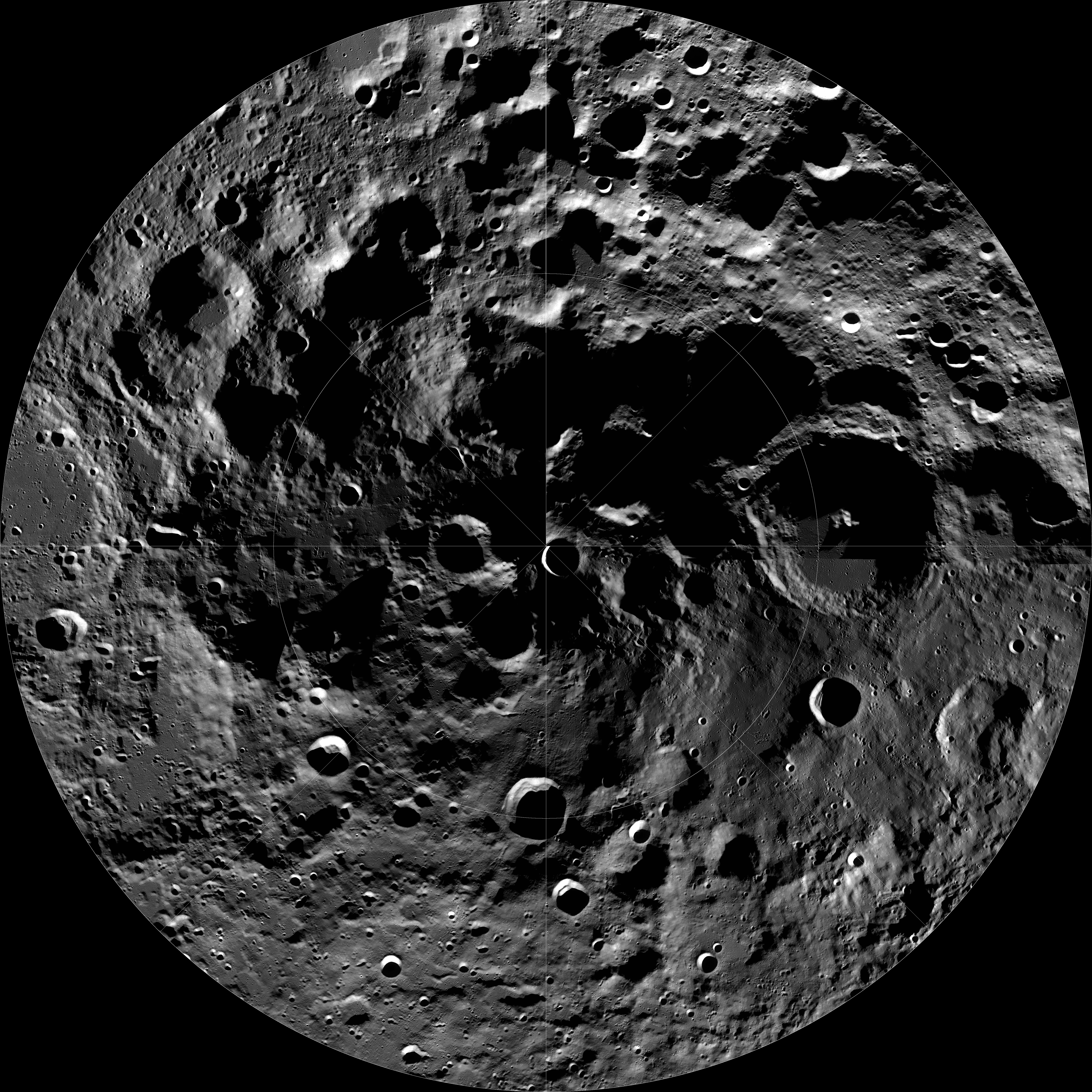
Lunar south pole
Tycho crater's central peak complex casts a long, dark shadow near local sunrise.
GRAIL-B images LRO in lunar orbit.

== See also ==
- Exploration of the Moon
- LCROSS
- List of missions to the Moon
- Lunar Atmosphere and Dust Environment Explorer
- Lunar outpost (NASA)
- Lunar water
- Mars Reconnaissance Orbiter
- SELENE
- THEMIS
- United Launch Alliance
- WIND spacecraft
- Zooniverse – Moon Zoo
