= LCROSS =

Lunar Impactor

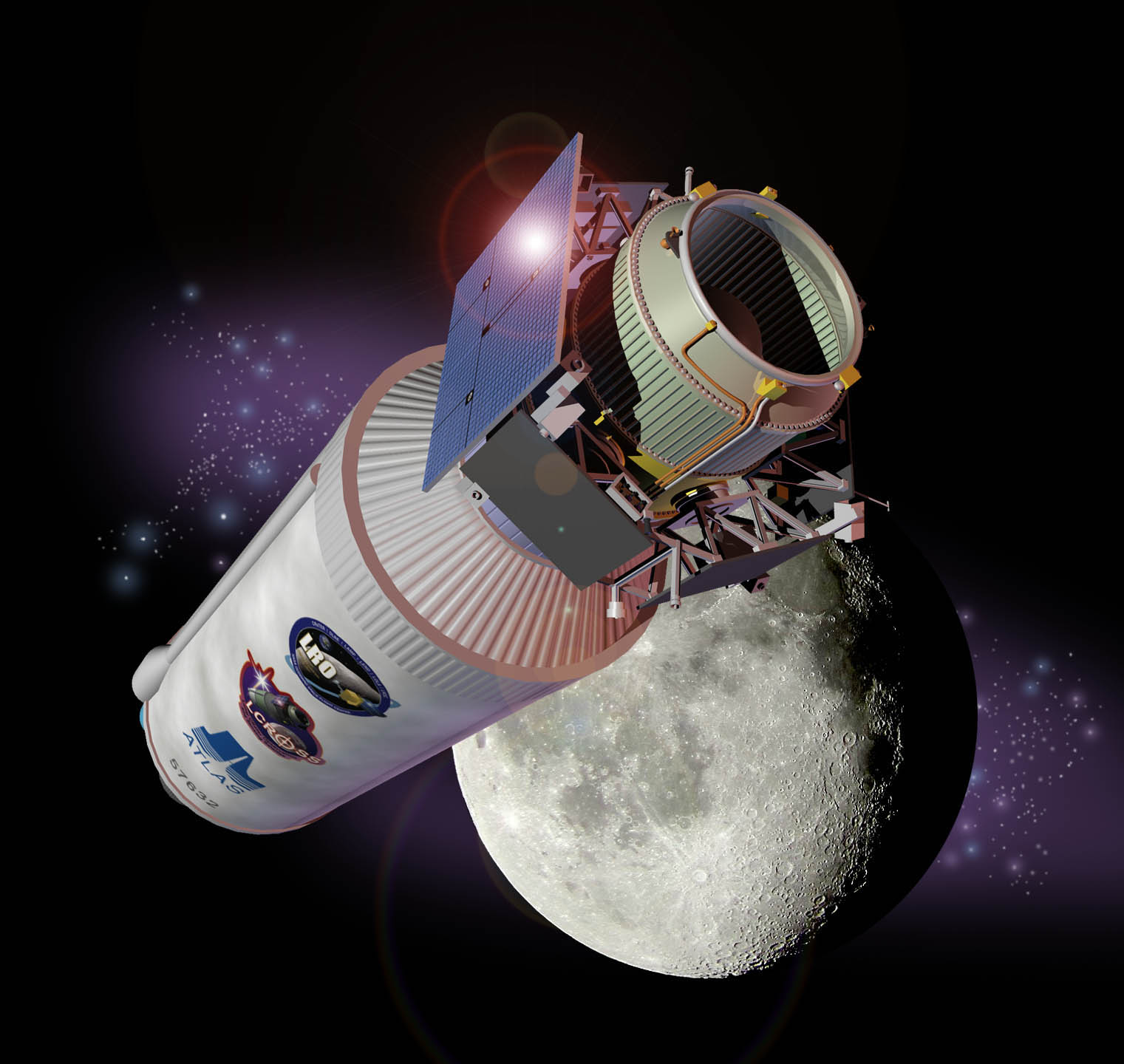
- LCROSS spacecraft, artist's rendering
- Mission type: Lunar impactor
- Operator: NASA / ARC
- COSPAR ID: 2009-031B
- SATCAT no.: 35316
- Website: NASA - LCROSS
- Mission duration: Launch to last impact: 3 mo., 20 days, 14 hrs., 5 min.

Spacecraft properties
- Bus: Eagle-0
- Manufacturer: Northrop Grumman
- Launch mass: Shepherding Spacecraft: 621 kilograms (1,369 lb); Centaur: 2,249 kilograms (4,958 lb)

Start of mission
- Launch date: June 18, 2009, 21:32:00 UTC
- Rocket: Atlas V 401
- Launch site: Cape Canaveral SLC-41
- Contractor: United Launch Alliance

Orbital parameters
- Reference system: Geocentric
- Regime: High Earth
- Period: 37 days

Lunar impactor
- Impact date: October 9, 2009, 11:37 UTC

The Lunar Crater Observation and Sensing Satellite (LCROSS) was a robotic spacecraft operated by NASA. The mission was conceived as a low-cost means of determining the nature of hydrogen detected at the polar regions of the Moon. Launched immediately after discovery of lunar water by Chandrayaan-1, the main LCROSS mission objective was to further explore the presence of water in the form of ice in a permanently shadowed crater near a lunar polar region. It was successful in confirming water in the southern lunar crater Cabeus.

It was launched together with the Lunar Reconnaissance Orbiter (LRO) on June 18, 2009, as part of the shared Lunar Precursor Robotic Program, the first American mission to the Moon in over ten years.

LCROSS was designed to collect and relay data from the impact and debris plume resulting from the launch vehicle's spent Centaur upper stage (and data-collecting Shepherding Spacecraft) striking the crater Cabeus near the south pole of the Moon.

Centaur had nominal impact mass of 2,305 kg (5,081 lb), and an impact velocity of about 9,000 km/h (5,600 mph), releasing the kinetic energy equivalent of detonating approximately 2 tons of TNT (7.2 GJ).

LCROSS suffered a malfunction on August 22, depleting half of its fuel and leaving very little fuel margin in the spacecraft.

Centaur impacted successfully on October 9, 2009, at 11:31 UTC. The Shepherding Spacecraft descended through Centaur's ejectate plume, collected and relayed data, impacting six minutes later at 11:37 UTC.

Contrary to media reports at the time, neither the impact nor its dust cloud could be seen from Earth, using the naked eye or telescopes.

== Mission ==
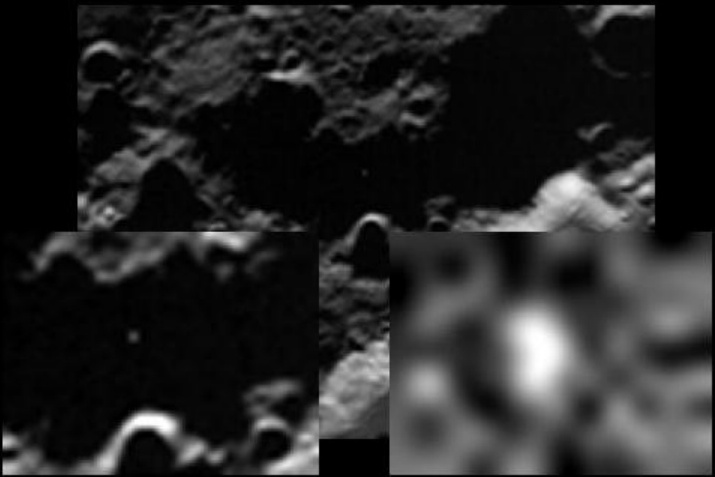
The flash from the LCROSS Centaur impact.

LCROSS was a fast-track, low-cost companion mission to the LRO. The LCROSS payload was added after NASA moved the LRO from the Delta II to a larger launch vehicle. It was chosen from 19 other proposals. LCROSS's mission was dedicated to late American broadcaster Walter Cronkite.

LCROSS launched with the LRO aboard an Atlas V rocket from Cape Canaveral, Florida, on June 18, 2009, at 21:32 UTC (17:32 EDT). On June 23, four and a half days after launch, LCROSS and its attached Centaur booster rocket successfully completed a lunar swingby and entered into polar Earth orbit with a period of 37 days, positioning LCROSS for impact on a lunar pole.

Early in the morning on August 22, 2009, LCROSS ground controllers discovered an anomaly caused by a sensor problem, which had resulted in the spacecraft using up 140 kilograms (309 pounds) of fuel, more than half of the fuel remaining at the time. According to Dan Andrews, the LCROSS project manager, "Our estimates now are if we pretty much baseline the mission, meaning just accomplish the things that we have to [do] to get the job done with full mission success, we're still in the black on propellant, but not by a lot."

The LCROSS trajectory

Animation of LCROSS's trajectory from June 18, 2009, to October 9, 2009 LCROSS · Moon · Earth

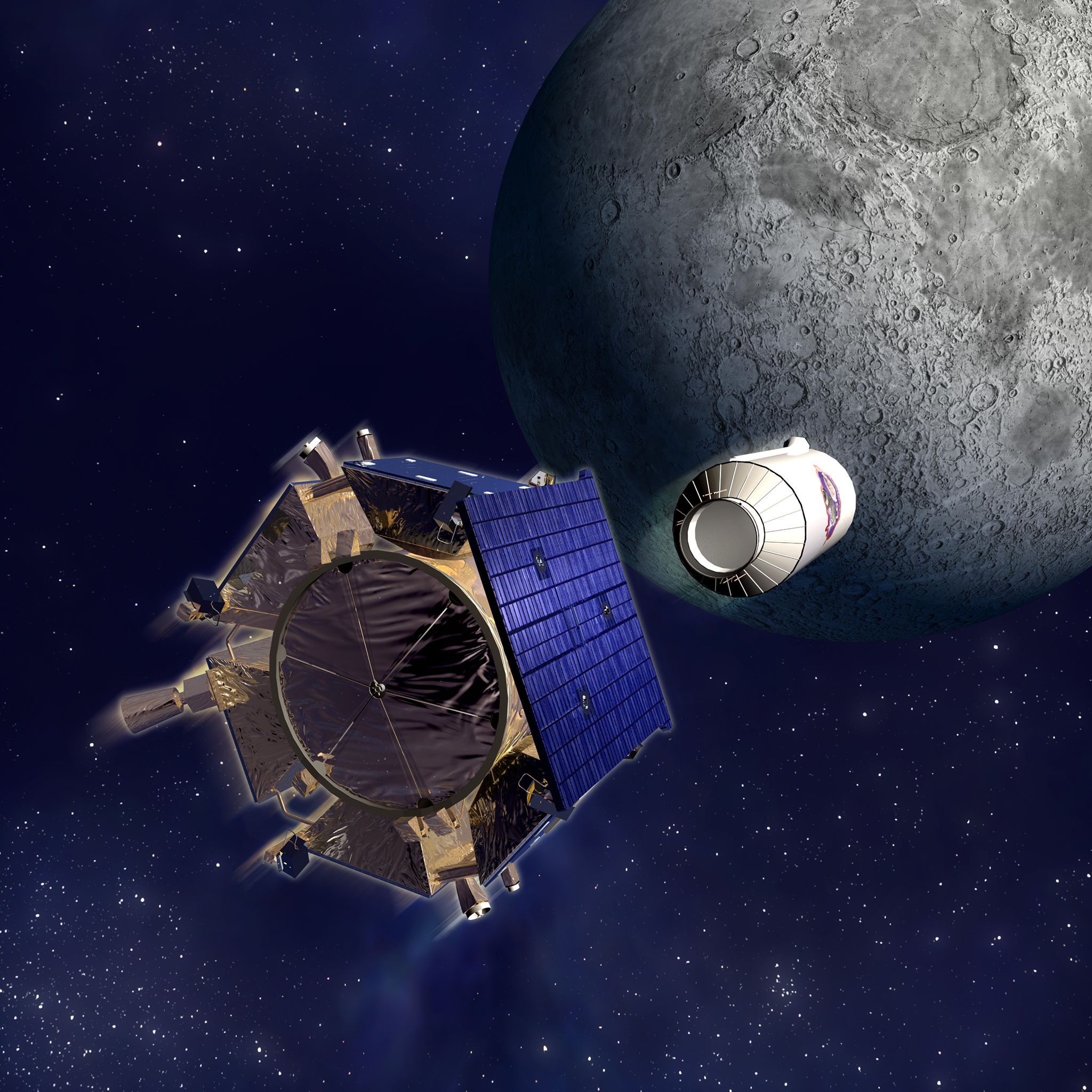
An illustration of the LCROSS Centaur rocket stage and Shepherding Spacecraft as they approach impact with the lunar south pole on October 9, 2009.

Lunar impacts, after approximately three orbits, occurred on October 9, 2009, with the Centaur crashing into the Moon at 11:31 UTC and the Shepherding Spacecraft following a few minutes later. The mission team initially announced that Cabeus A would be the target crater for the LCROSS dual impacts, but later refined the target to be the larger, main Cabeus crater.

On its final approach to the Moon, the Shepherding Spacecraft and Centaur separated October 9, 2009, at 01:50 UTC. The Centaur upper stage acted as a heavy impactor to create a debris plume that rose above the lunar surface. Following four minutes after impact of the Centaur upper stage, the Shepherding Spacecraft flew through this debris plume, collecting and relaying data back to Earth before it struck the lunar surface to produce a second debris plume. The impact velocity was projected to be 9,000 km/h (5,600 mph) or 2.5 km/second.

The Centaur impact was expected to excavate more than 350 metric tons (390 short tons) of lunar material and create a crater about 27 m (90 ft) in diameter to a depth of about 5 m (16 ft). The Shepherding Spacecraft impact was projected to excavate an estimated 150 metric tons (170 short tons) and create a crater approximately 18 m (60 ft) in diameter to a depth of about 3 m (10 ft). Most of the material in the Centaur debris plume was expected to remain at (lunar) altitudes below 10 km (6 mi).

It was hoped that spectral analysis of the resulting impact plume would help to confirm preliminary findings by the Clementine and Lunar Prospector missions which hinted that there may be water ice in the permanently shadowed regions. Mission scientists expected that the Centaur impact plume would be visible through amateur-class telescopes with apertures as small as 25 to 30 cm (10 to 12 inches). But no plume was observed by such amateur telescopes. Even world class telescopes such as the Hale Telescope, equipped with adaptive optics, did not detect the plume. The plume may have still occurred but at a small scale not detectable from Earth. Both impacts were also monitored by Earth-based observatories and by orbital assets, such as the Hubble Space Telescope.

Whether or not LCROSS would find water had been stated to be influential in whether or not the United States government pursues creating a Moon base. On November 13, 2009, NASA confirmed that water was detected after the Centaur impacted the crater.

== Spacecraft ==
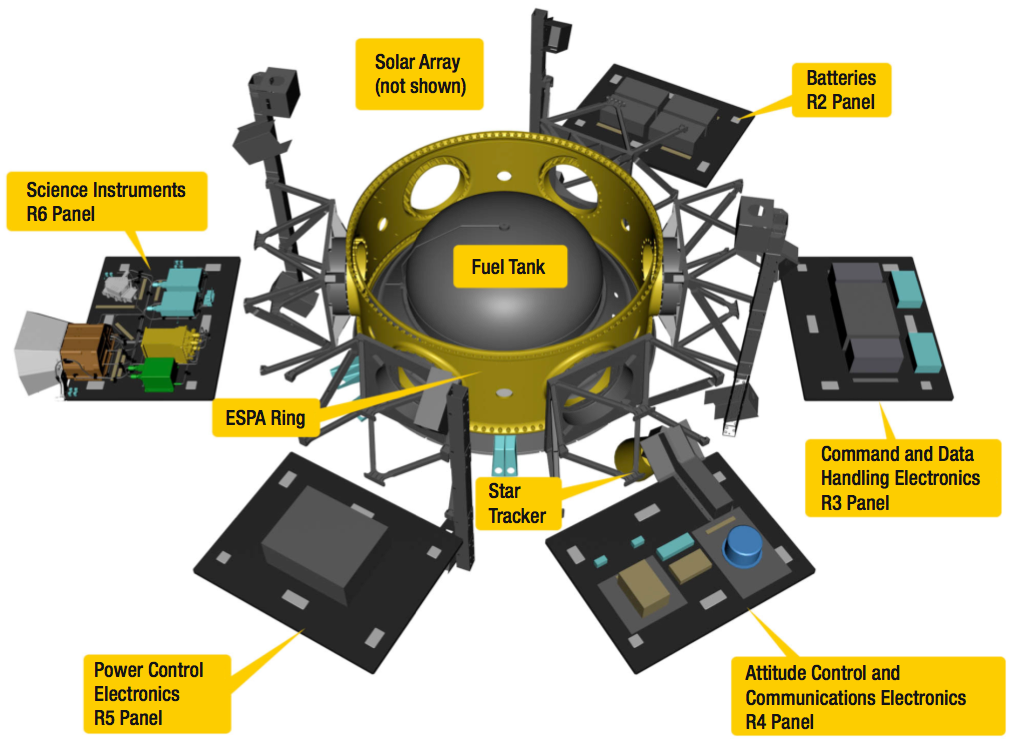
LCROSS spacecraft (exploded view)

The LCROSS mission took advantage of the structural capabilities of the Evolved Expendable Launch Vehicle (EELV) Secondary Payload Adapter (ESPA) ring used to attach LRO to the Centaur upper-stage rocket to form the Shepherding Spacecraft. Mounted on the outside of the ESPA were six panels that hold the spacecraft's science payload, command and control systems, communications equipment, batteries, and solar panels. A small monopropellant propulsion system was mounted inside of the ring. Also attached were two S Band omnidirectional antennas and two medium-gain antennas. The mission's strict schedule, mass, and budget constraints posed difficult challenges to engineering teams from NASA Ames Research Center (ARC) and Northrop Grumman. Their creative thinking led to a unique use of the ESPA ring and innovative sourcing of other spacecraft components. Usually, the ESPA ring is used as a platform to hold six small deployable satellites; for LCROSS, it became the backbone of the satellite, a first for the ring. LCROSS also took advantage of commercially available instruments and used many of the already-flight-verified components used on LRO.

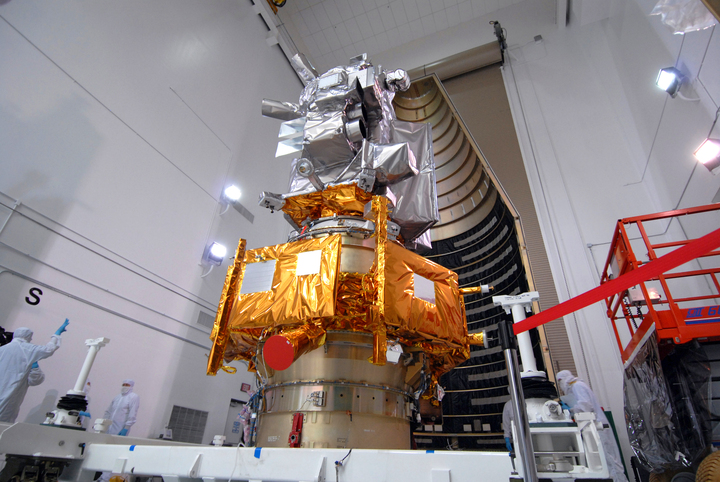
LRO (top, silver) and LCROSS (bottom, gold) prepared for fairing

LCROSS is managed by NASA's ARC and was built by Northrop Grumman. The LCROSS preliminary design review was completed on September 8, 2006. The LCROSS mission passed its Mission Confirmation Review on February 2, 2007, and its Critical Design Review on February 22, 2007. After assembly and testing at Ames, the instrument payload, provided by Ecliptic Enterprises Corporation, was shipped to Northrop Grumman on January 14, 2008, for integration with the spacecraft. LCROSS passed its review on February 12, 2009.

=== Instruments ===
The LCROSS Shepherding Spacecraft science instrument payload, provided by NASA's ARC, consisted of a total of nine instruments: one visible, two near infrared, and two mid-infrared cameras; one visible and two near-infrared spectrometers; and a photometer. A data handling unit (DHU) collected the information from each instrument for transmission back to LCROSS Mission Control. Because of the schedule and budget constraints, LCROSS took advantage of rugged, commercially available components. The individual instruments went through a rigorous testing cycle that simulated launch and flight conditions, identifying design weaknesses and necessary modifications for use in space, at which point the manufacturers were allowed to modify their designs.

== Results ==
The impact was not as visually prominent as had been anticipated. Project manager Dan Andrews believed that this was due to pre-crash simulations that exaggerated the plume's prominence. Because of data bandwidth issues, the exposures were kept short, which made the plume difficult to see in the images in the visible spectra. This resulted in the need for image processing to increase clarity. The infrared camera also captured a thermal signature of the booster's impact.

=== Presence of water ===
On November 13, 2009, NASA reported that multiple lines of evidence show water was present in both the high-angle vapor plume and the ejecta curtain created by the LCROSS Centaur impact. As of November 2009, the concentration and distribution of water and other substances required more analysis. Additional confirmation came from an emission in the ultraviolet spectrum that was attributed to hydroxyl fragments, a product from the break-up of water by sunlight. Analysis of the spectra indicate that a reasonable estimate of the concentration of water in the frozen regolith is on the order of one percent. Evidence from other missions suggests that this may have been a relatively dry spot, as thick deposits of relatively pure ice appear to present themselves in other craters. A later, more definitive, analysis found the concentration of water to be "5.6 ± 2.9% by mass." On August 20, 2018, NASA confirmed ice on the surface at the Moon's poles.

=== Imagery ===
LCROSS lunar swingby photos (June 23, 2009)
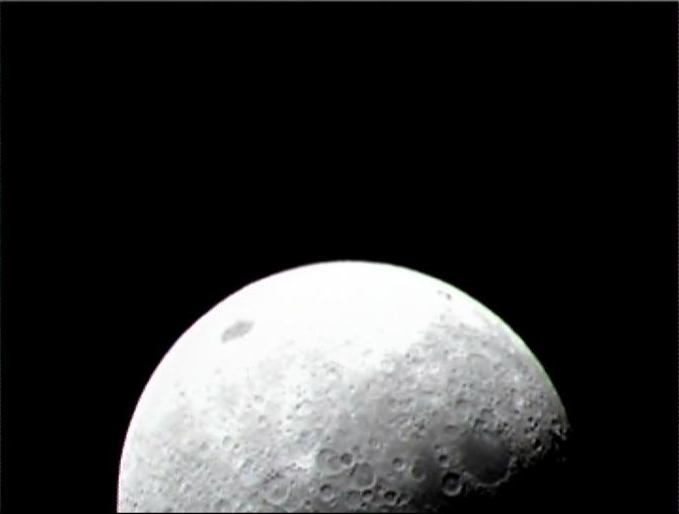
One of the first images from the Lunar Crater Observation and Sensing Satellite (LCROSS) using the visible light camera during the swingby of the Moon. LCROSS has nine science instruments that collect different types of data which are complementary to each other.

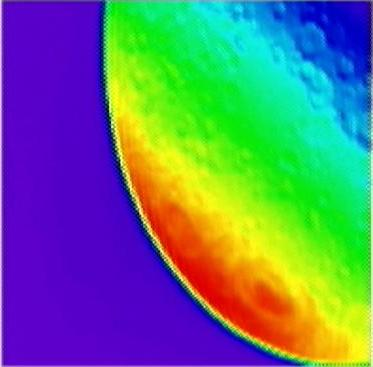
An infrared camera image of the Moon taken with the Lunar Crater Observation and Sensing Satellite (LCROSS) mid-infrared camera. This is the first infrared image ever taken of the far side of the Moon.

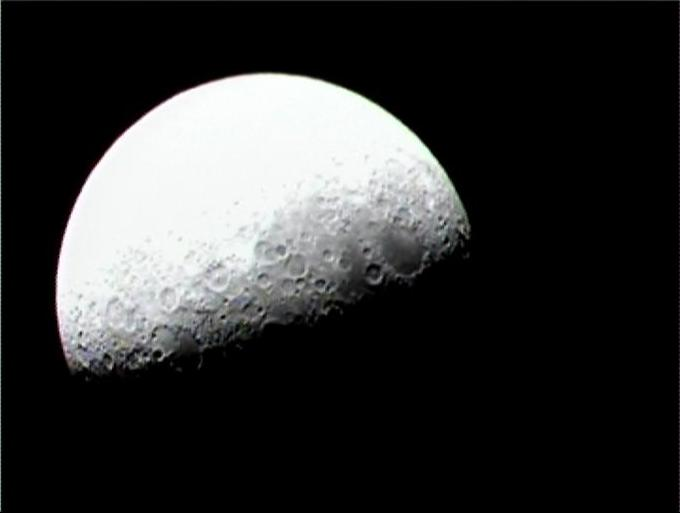
Another visible light camera image of the Moon taken by the LCROSS spacecraft during lunar swingby
LCROSS Centaur separation photos (Impact - 9hrs 40min, October 9, 2009)
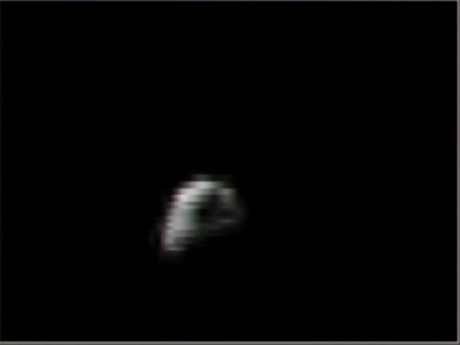
Near infrared image of the LCROSS Centaur separation as seen from the LCROSS Shepherding Spacecraft

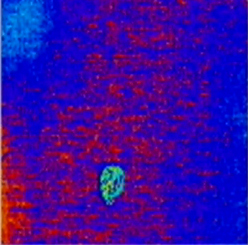
Mid infrared (false color) image of the LCROSS Centaur separation (red->hot, blue->cold)

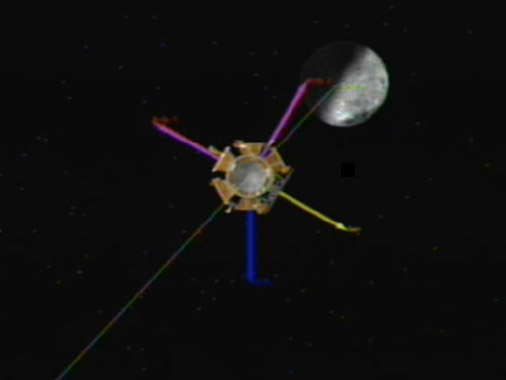
STK (Satellite Tool Kit) image of the LCROSS spacecraft after Centaur separation
Centaur/LCROSS impact photos (11:31 UTC October 9, 2009)
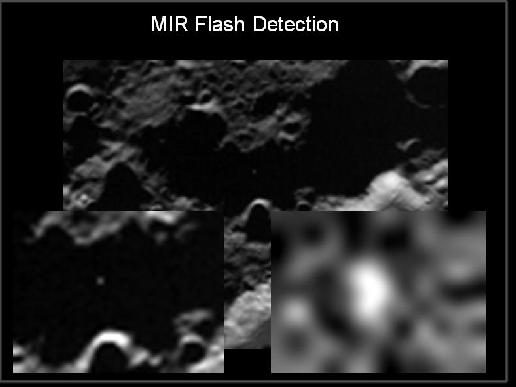
Image taken of the Centaur upper stage impact in the Cabeus crater near the south pole of the Moon. The images were taken by the LCROSS Shepherding Spacecraft.

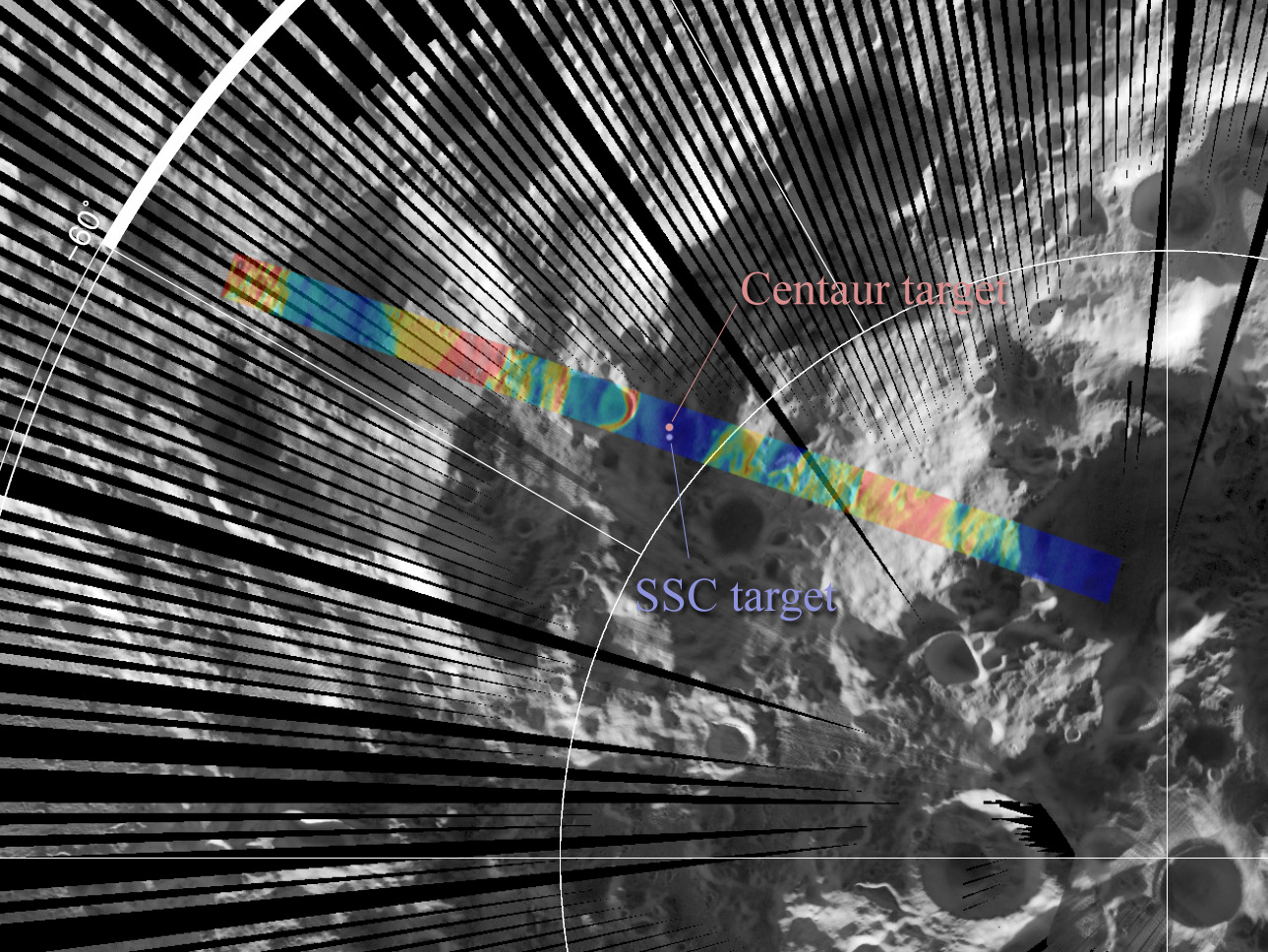
Locations of the Diviner LCROSS impact swaths overlain on a grayscale daytime thermal map of the Moon’s south polar region. Diviner data were used to help select the final LCROSS impact site inside Cabeus Crater, which sampled an extremely cold region in permanent shadow that can serve as an effective cold trap for water ice and other frozen volatiles.

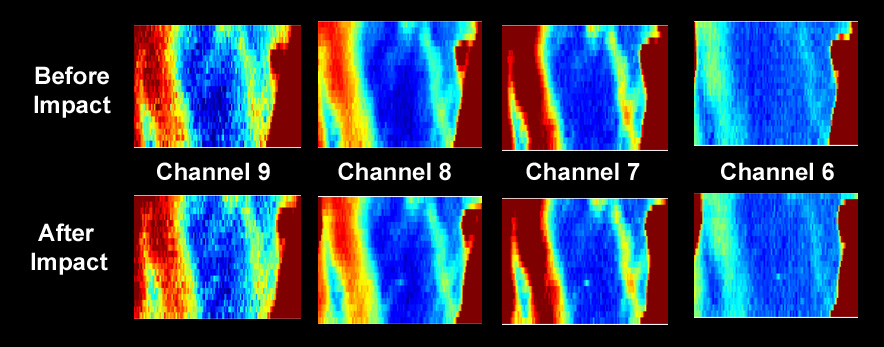
Preliminary, uncalibrated LRO/Diviner thermal maps of the Centaur/LCROSS impact site acquired two hours before the impact, and 90 seconds after the impact. The thermal signature of the impact was clearly detected in all four Diviner thermal mapping channels.

== Awards ==
LCROSS has received numerous awards for its technical, managerial, and scientific accomplishments.

- 2010: Northrop Grumman Northrop Grumman Corporate 2010 Award for Excellence (Northrop Grumman team)
- 2010: Popular Mechanics magazine's 2010 Breakthrough Award for innovation in science and technology.
- 2010: NASA Honor Award – Group Achievement, (LCROSS Science Team)
- 2010: NASA Honor Award – Group Achievement, (LCROSS Mission Operations Team)
- 2010: NASA Honor Award – Group Achievement, for "outstanding professionalism, innovation in outreach and education, and for integrating outreach for two missions into one launch." (LRO/LCROSS/LPRP EPO teams)
- 2010: NASA Honor Award - Exceptional Achievement Medal, (Rusty Hunt)
- 2010: NASA Honor Award - Outstanding Leadership Medal, (Dan Andrews & Tony Colaprete)
- 2010: NASA Honor Award - Group Achievement, LCROSS Science and Payload Team
- 2010: NASA Ames Honor Award, category "Exceptional Achievement" (Ken Galal)
- 2010: Northrop Grumman AS Sector President's Award, category "Operational Excellence" (Northrop Grumman team)
- 2010: Aviation Week Laureate Award Nominee, Category "Space"
- 2010: Space Foundation "John L. 'Jack' Swigert Jr., Award for Space Exploration"
- 2010: National Space Society "Space Pioneer Award" 2009, Category "Science and Engineering"
- 2010: Northrop Grumman "Distinguished Engineering Project Achievement Award", 55th Annual Engineering Council
- 2010: NASA OCE Systems Engineering Award, NASA Office of Chief Engineer
- 2010: Aviation Week 2009 Program Excellence Award, Category "System Level Production & Sustainment"
- 2009: Northrop Grumman Technical Services' "Award for Excellence": 2009, (LCROSS team)
- 2009: NASA Ames Honor Award, category "team" (LCROSS Team)
- 2009: NASA Ames Honor Award, category "Engineering" (Tom Luzod)
- 2009: NASA Honor Award - Exceptional Achievement Medal, (Dan Andrews)
- 2009: NASA Honor Award - Group Achievement, LCROSS Project Team
- 2009: NASA Systems Engineering Excellence Award, (Darin Foreman, Bob Barber)
- 2008: ILEWG International Lunar Exploration "Technology Award", for the development of advanced technologies within hard constraints of short time and cost
- 2008: NASA Ames Honor Award, category "Engineering" (Bob Barber)
- 2008: Northrop Grumman "Mission Excellence" Award, LCROSS Spacecraft Team
- 2007: NASA Ames Honor Award - Group Achievement, Successful completion of CDR
- 2006: NASA Ames Honor Award, category "Project Management" (Dan Andrews)

== See also ==
- List of artificial objects on the Moon
- List of missions to the Moon
- Lunar water
- Project A119 a higher-powered lunar excavator, a nuclear explosive device mission of the 1950s, never attempted

== External resources ==
- NASA - LCROSS (Lunar CRater Observation and Sensing Satellite), nasa.gov
- Lunar CRater Observation and Sensing Satellite at NASA Ames Research Center, lcross.arc.nasa.gov
- LCROSS Flight Director's Blog on blogs.nasa.gov
- NASA's Post-Impact News Conference on YouTube
- Why NASA Should Bomb the Moon to Find Water: Analysis, 2009-09-11, Popular Mechanics, popularmechanics.com
- Anthony Colaprete (2010-10-22). "Detection of Water in the LCROSS Ejecta Plume". Science. 330 (6003): 463–468. Bibcode:2010Sci...330..463C. doi:10.1126/science.1186986. PMID 20966242. S2CID 206525375.
- Anthony Colaprete's public lecture on the mission in the Silicon Valley Astronomy Lecture Series
- Nancy Atkinson (2009-10-07). "Guide to Seeing the LCROSS Lunar Impact". Universe Today.
- LCROSS Lunar Impactor - Lessons Learned from a Small Satellite Mission—Dan Andrews (NASA LCROSS Program Director) (PDF)
