= InterPlaNet =

Long-ranged communications and networking protocol

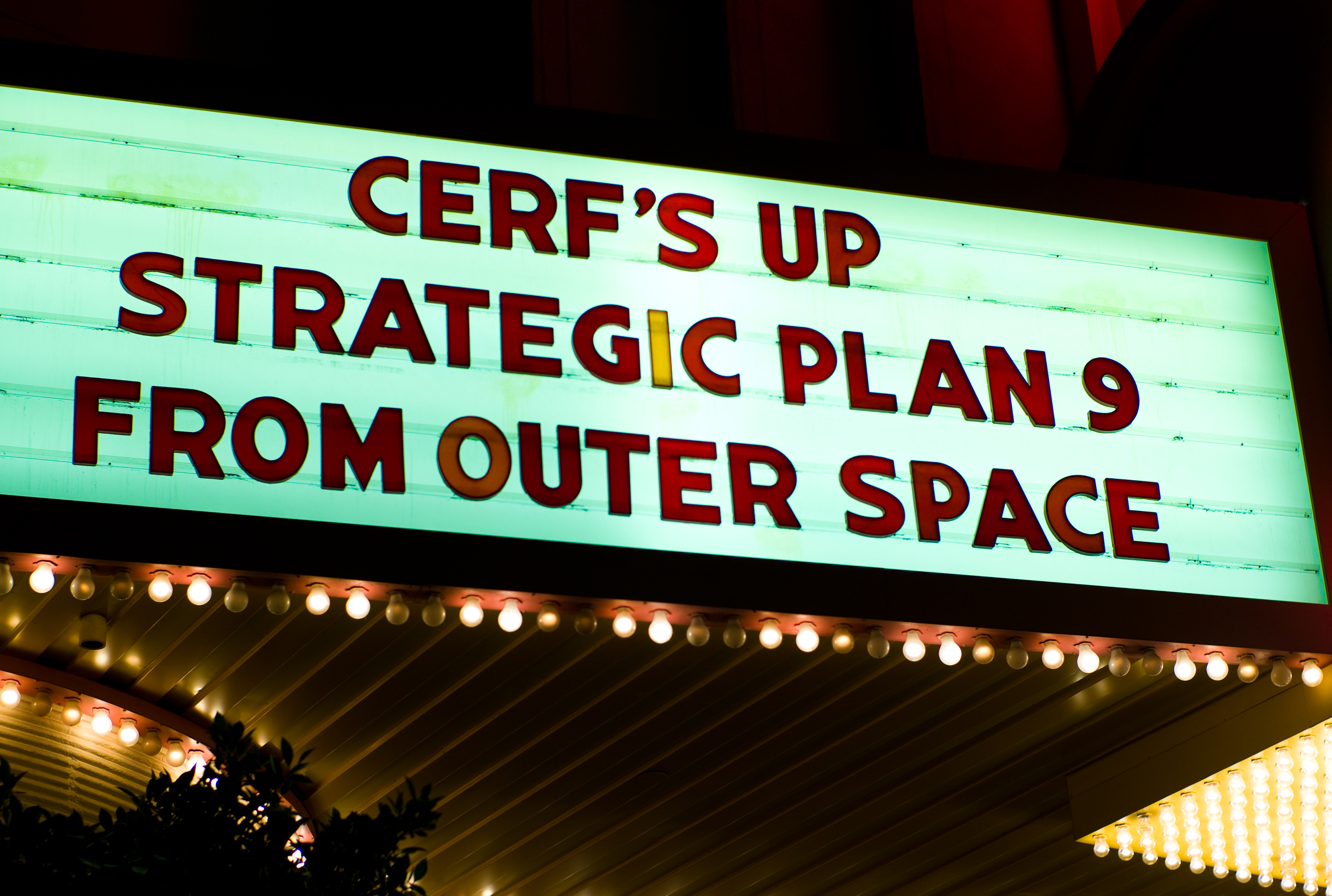
ICANN meeting, Los Angeles, USA, 2007.

InterPlaNet (IPN) is a computer networking protocol designed to operate at interplanetary distances, where traditional protocols such as the Internet Protocol break down. It is the base for Interplanetary Internet. It has been under development by Vint Cerf and NASA since 1998 and a permanent network link to Mars was planned by 2008 until the Mars Telecommunications Orbiter was canceled in 2005. The protocol was expected to be space-qualified and ready for use by around 2010.

== IPN Protocol Stack ==
The distance between the planets and their constant motion impose long and variable delay on the communications. Thus, the traditional protocol stack doesn't function properly. Delay/Disruption Tolerant Network (DTN) is implemented to address these constraints. DTN inserts a new set of protocols, called Bundling Protocols (BPs), to the traditional protocol stack. BP is a standard method of transmitting data using store-and-forward, where data are stored for a period of time at intermediate nodes along a network path, and forwarded to the next station when a link is available. Licklider Transmission Protocol (LTP) is a BP and a transport protocol that functions in deep space. For an example of a dataflow with an intermediate space satellite between the deep space and the earth, see the figure. The intermediate node has two transport protocols, LTP (for data transmission over deep space communication links), and TCP (for transmission over earth communication links). The intermediate node turns the received data from LTP packets into TCP packets using their underlying convergence layer protocols. The protocols in the lower layers might change to support the corresponding communication and network.

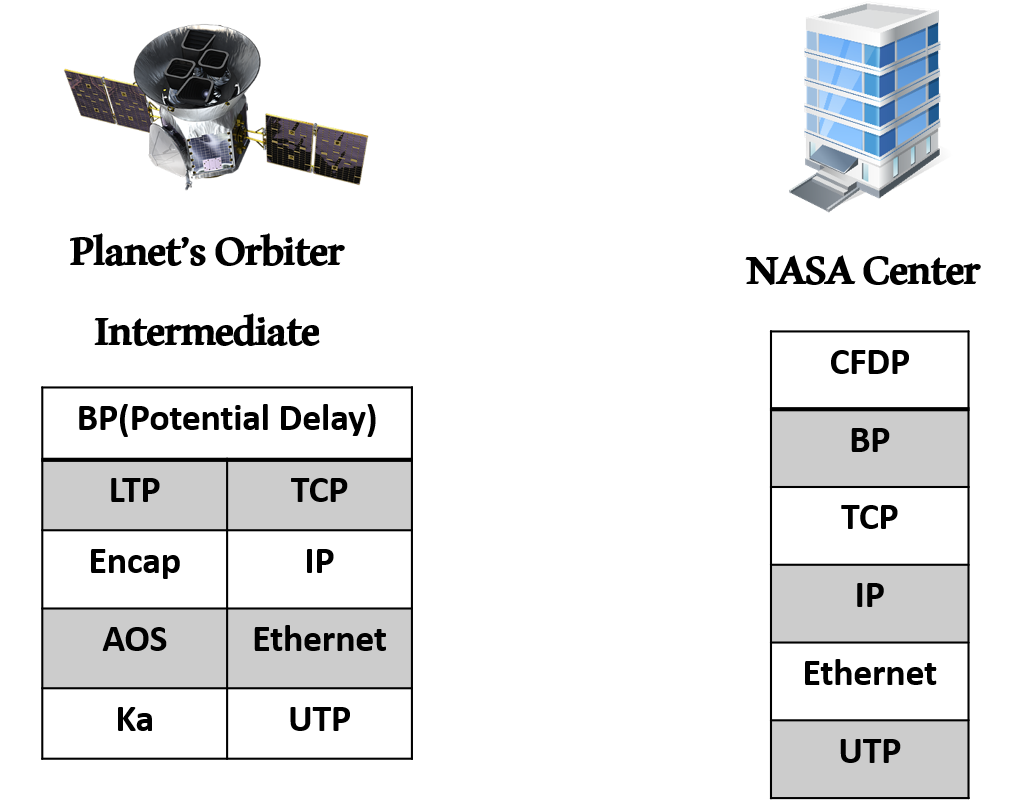
Overview of Bundling Protocol function. An intermediate node's BP turns the bundles from LTP packets into TCP packets.

== See also ==
- Intergalactic Computer Network
- Interplanetary Internet
- Delay-tolerant networking
