= IPN =

IPN may refer to:

== Payments ==
- Instant payment notification

== Chemistry ==
- Interpenetrating polymer network, form of chemical copolymer
- Isopropyl nitrate, a liquid monopropellant

== Industry ==
- IPN, a type of I-beam used on European standards

== Outer space ==
- Interplanetary Internet
- InterPlaNet
- InterPlanetary Network, a group of spacecraft equipped with gamma-ray burst detectors

== Medicine and anatomy ==
- Infectious pancreatic necrosis, disease in fish
- Interpeduncular nucleus, a region of the brain

== Other ==
- Index of Place Names in Great Britain
- World Bank's Inspection Panel of the World Bank Group
- Instytut Pamięci Narodowej (Institute of National Remembrance), a Polish historical research institute
- Instituto Pedro Nunes, technology transfer center of the University of Coimbra
- Instituto Politécnico Nacional (National Polytechnic Institute), Mexican university
- International Policy Network (1971–2011), former British think tank
- International Polio Network, former name of Post-Polio Health International
- IPN, IATA code for Usiminas Airport in Minas Gerais, Brazil
- International pitch notation, a method to specify musical pitch
