= Adrian Hooke =

British engineer

- Born: United Kingdom
- Died: January 7, 2013; Malibu, California
- Education: University of Birmingham, UK
- Known for: cofounder of Consultative Committee for Space Data Systems
- Spouse: Merle McKenzie
- Children: 2
- Engineering career
- Discipline: Telecommunications
- Institutions: NASA, ESA, CCSDS
- Awards: NASA Exceptional Service Medal (twice); NASA Exceptional Achievement Medal; CCSDS Lifetime Leader Award (2012)

Adrian Hooke (died January 7, 2013) was an aerospace telecommunications engineer, and a cofounder of the Consultative Committee for Space Data Systems.

== Biography ==
Adrian Hooke held a B.Sc in Electronic and Electrical Engineering from the University of Birmingham, England.

He worked on the Apollo program and other NASA programs as a young engineer. In 1982, he cofounded the Consultative Committee for Space Data Systems (CCSDS), an international consortium of space agencies, and remained active in the organization until 2012. Hooke helped develop standards published by the CCSDS, including the Space Communications Protocol Specifications (SCPS). He was involved in the Interplanetary Internet and Delay Tolerant Networking efforts to bring more computer networking into NASA telecommunications.

== Awards ==
- NASA Exceptional Service Medal (twice)
- NASA Exceptional Achievement Medal
- Special CCSDS Lifetime Leader Award, 2012

== Personal life ==
Documented with testimonials at the |family tribute website.
