= Interplanetary internet =

Model of internet between planets

The speed of light, illustrated here by a beam of light traveling from Earth to the Moon in 1.26 seconds, would limit the speed at which messages would be able to travel in the interplanetary internet. Due to the vast distances involved, much longer delays may be incurred than in the terrestrial internet.

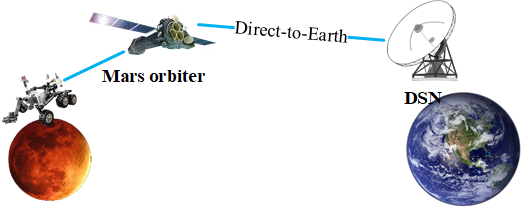
Simplified interplanetary internet overview, Mars to Earth communication

The interplanetary internet is a conceived computer network in space, consisting of a set of network nodes that can communicate with each other. These nodes are the planet's orbiters and landers, and the Earth ground stations. For example, the orbiters collect the scientific data from the Curiosity rover on Mars through near-Mars communication links, transmit the data to Earth through direct links from the Mars orbiters to the Earth ground stations via the NASA Deep Space Network, and finally, the data is routed through Earth's internal internet.

Interplanetary communication is greatly delayed by interplanetary distances, as data transmission can only go as fast as the speed of light, so a new set of protocols and technologies that are tolerant to large delays and errors are required. The interplanetary internet has been envisioned as a store and forward network of internets that is often disconnected, has a wireless backbone fraught with error-prone links and delays ranging from tens of minutes to even hours, even when there is a connection.

As of 2024 agencies and companies working towards bringing the network to fruition include NASA, ESA, SpaceX and Blue Origin.

== Challenges and reasons ==
In the core implementation of the interplanetary internet, satellites orbiting a planet communicate to other planets' satellites. Simultaneously, these planets revolve around the Sun with long distances, and thus many challenges face the communications. The reasons and the resultant challenges are:

1. The motion and long distances between planets: The interplanetary communication is greatly delayed due to the interplanetary distances and the motion of the planets. The delay is variable and long, ranging from a couple of minutes (Earth-to-Mars), to a couple of hours (Pluto-to-Earth), depending on their relative positions. The interplanetary communication also suspends due to the solar conjunction, when the sun's radiation hinders the direct communication between the planets. As such, the communication characterizes lossy links and intermittent link connectivity.
2. Low embeddable payload: Satellites can only carry a small payload, which poses challenges to the power, mass, size, and cost for communication hardware design. An asymmetric bandwidth would be the result of this limitation. This asymmetry reaches ratios up to 1000:1 as a downlink:uplink bandwidth portion.
3. Absence of fixed infrastructure: The graph of participating nodes in a specific planet-to-planet communication keeps changing over time, due to the constant motion. The routes of the planet-to-planet communication are planned and scheduled rather than being opportunistic.

The interplanetary internet design must address these challenges to operate successfully and achieve good communication with other planets. It also must use the few available resources efficiently in the system.

== Development ==
Space communication technology has steadily evolved from expensive, one-of-a-kind point-to-point architectures to the reuse of technology on successive missions to the development of standard protocols agreed upon by space agencies of many countries. This last phase has gone on since 1982 through the efforts of the Consultative Committee for Space Data Systems (CCSDS), a body composed of the major space agencies of the world. It has 11 member agencies, 32 observer agencies, and over 119 industrial associates.

The evolution of space data system standards has gone on in parallel with the evolution of the internet, with conceptual cross-pollination where fruitful, but largely as a separate evolution. Since the late 1990s, familiar internet protocols and CCSDS space link protocols have integrated and converged in several ways; for example, the successful FTP file transfer to Earth-orbiting STRV 1B on January 2, 1996, which ran FTP over the CCSDS IPv4-like Space Communications Protocol Specifications (SCPS) protocols. Internet Protocol use without CCSDS has taken place on spacecraft, e.g., demonstrations on the UoSAT-12 satellite, and operationally on the Disaster Monitoring Constellation. Having reached the era where networking and IP on board spacecraft have been shown to be feasible and reliable, a forward-looking study of the bigger picture was the next phase.

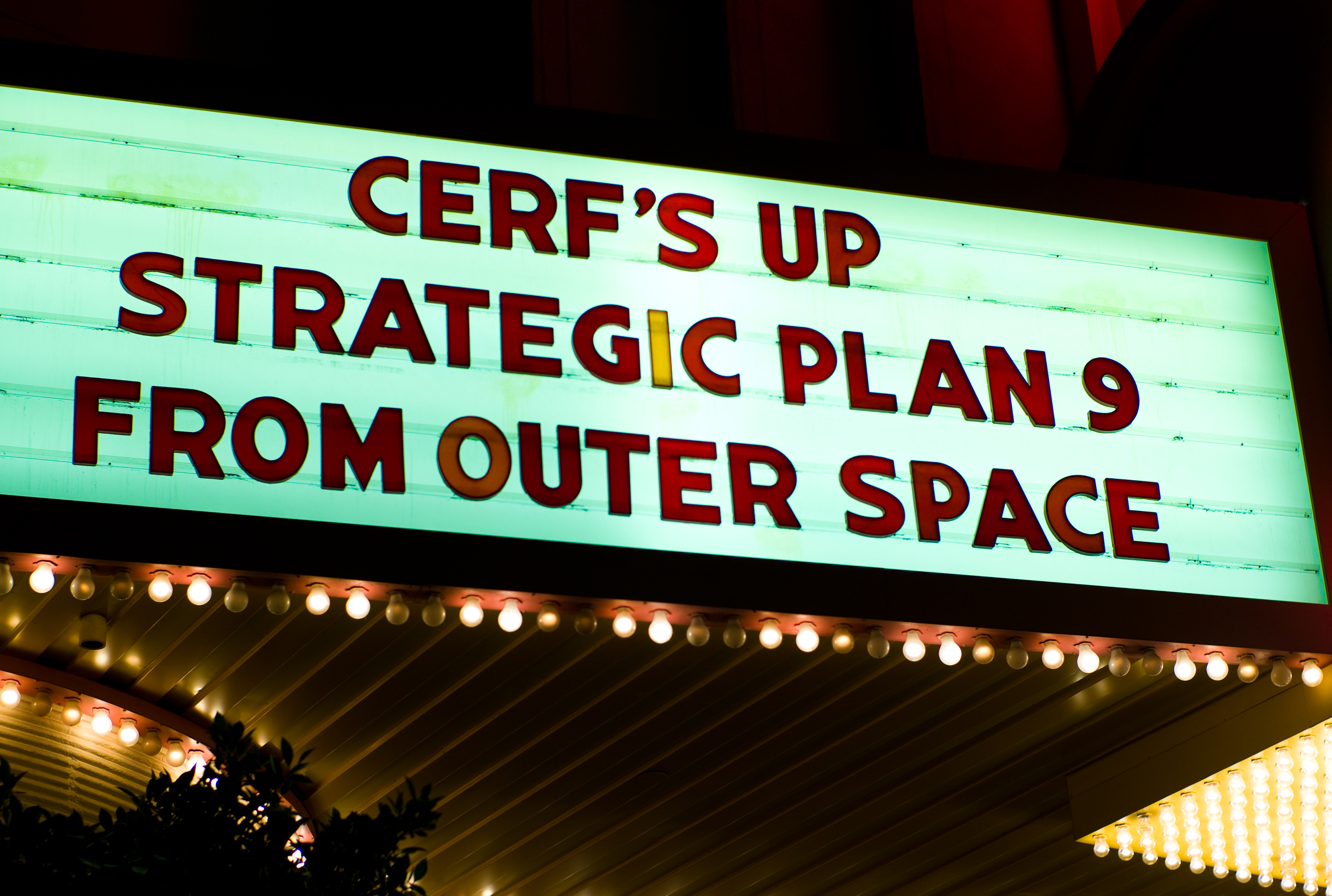
ICANN meeting, Los Angeles, USA, 2007. The marquee pays a humorous homage to the Ed Wood film Plan 9 from Outer Space (1959), and the operating system Plan 9 from Bell Labs, while namedropping internet pioneer Vint Cerf using a spoof of a then-current film Surf's Up (2007).

The interplanetary internet study at NASA's Jet Propulsion Laboratory (JPL) was started by a team of scientists at JPL led by internet pioneer Vinton Cerf and the late Adrian Hooke. Cerf was appointed as a distinguished visiting scientist at JPL in 1998, while Hooke was one of the founders and directors of CCSDS.

While IP-like SCPS protocols are feasible for short hops, such as ground station to orbiter, rover to lander, lander to orbiter, probe to flyby, and so on, delay-tolerant networking is needed to get information from one region of the Solar System to another. It becomes apparent that the concept of a region is a natural architectural factoring of the interplanetary internet.

A region is an area where the characteristics of communication are the same. Region characteristics include communications, security, the maintenance of resources, perhaps ownership, and other factors. The interplanetary internet is a "network of regional internets".

What is needed then, is a standard way to achieve end-to-end communication through multiple regions in a disconnected, variable-delay environment using a generalized suite of protocols. Examples of regions might include the terrestrial internet as a region, a region on the surface of the Moon or Mars, or a ground-to-orbit region.

The recognition of this requirement led to the concept of a "bundle" as a high-level way to address the generalized Store-and-Forward problem. Bundles are an area of new protocol development in the upper layers of the OSI model, above the Transport Layer with the goal of addressing the issue of bundling store-and-forward information so that it can reliably traverse radically dissimilar environments constituting a "network of regional internets".

Delay-tolerant networking (DTN) was designed to enable standardized communications over long distances and through time delays. At its core is the Bundle Protocol (BP), which is similar to the Internet Protocol, or IP, that serves as the heart of the internet here on Earth. The big difference between the regular Internet Protocol (IP) and the Bundle Protocol is that IP assumes a seamless end-to-end data path, while BP is built to account for errors and disconnections—glitches that commonly plague deep-space communications.

Bundle Service Layering, implemented as the Bundling protocol suite for delay-tolerant networking, will provide general-purpose delay-tolerant protocol services in support of a range of applications: custody transfer, segmentation and reassembly, end-to-end reliability, end-to-end security, and end-to-end routing among them. The Bundle Protocol was first tested in space on the UK-DMC satellite in 2008.

The Deep Impact mission

An example of one of these end-to-end applications flown on a space mission is the CCSDS File Delivery Protocol (CFDP), used on the Deep Impact comet mission. CFDP is an international standard for automatic, reliable file transfer in both directions. CFDP should not be confused with the Coherent File Distribution Protocol, which has the same acronym and is an IETF-documented experimental protocol for rapidly deploying files to multiple targets in a highly networked environment.

In addition to reliably copying a file from one entity (such as a spacecraft or ground station) to another entity, CFDP has the capability to reliably transmit arbitrarily small messages defined by the user, in the metadata accompanying the file and to reliably transmit commands relating to file system management that are to be executed automatically on the remote end-point entity (such as a spacecraft) upon successful reception of a file.

== Protocol ==
The Consultative Committee for Space Data Systems (CCSDS) packet telemetry standard defines the protocol used for the transmission of spacecraft instrument data over the deep-space channel. Under this standard, an image or other data sent from a spacecraft instrument is transmitted using one or more packets.

=== CCSDS packet definition ===
A packet is a block of data with length that can vary between successive packets, ranging from 7 to 65,542 bytes, including the packet header.

- Packetized data is transmitted via frames, which are fixed-length data blocks. The size of a frame, including frame header and control information, can range up to 2048 bytes.
- Packet sizes are fixed during the development phase.

Because packet lengths are variable but frame lengths are fixed, packet boundaries usually do not coincide with frame boundaries.

=== Telecom processing notes ===
Data in a frame is typically protected from channel errors by error-correcting codes.

- Even when the channel errors exceed the correction capability of the error-correcting code, the presence of errors is nearly always detected by the error-correcting code or by a separate error-detecting code.
- Frames for which uncorrectable errors are detected are marked as undecodable and typically are deleted.

=== Handling data loss ===
Deleted undecodable whole frames are the principal type of data loss that affects compressed data sets. In general, there would be little to gain from attempting to use compressed data from a frame marked as undecodable.

- When errors are present in a frame, the bits of the subband pixels are already decoded before the first bit error will remain intact, but all subsequent decoded bits in the segment usually will be completely corrupted; a single bit error is often just as disruptive as many bit errors.
- Furthermore, compressed data are usually protected by powerful, long-blocklength error-correcting codes, which are the types of codes most likely to yield substantial fractions of bit errors throughout those frames that are undecodable.

Thus, frames with detected errors would be essentially unusable even if they were not deleted by the frame processor.

This data loss can be compensated for with the following mechanisms.

- If an erroneous frame escapes detection, the decompressor will blindly use the frame data as if they were reliable, whereas in the case of detected erroneous frames, the decompressor can base its reconstruction on incomplete, but not misleading, data.
- However, it is extremely rare for an erroneous frame to go undetected.
- For frames coded by the CCSDS Reed–Solomon code, fewer than 1 in 40,000 erroneous frames can escape detection.
- All frames not employing the Reed–Solomon code use a cyclic redundancy check (CRC) error-detecting code, which has an undetected frame-error rate of less than 1 in 32,000.

== Implementation ==
The InterPlanetary Internet Special Interest Group of the Internet Society has worked on defining protocols and standards that would make the IPN possible. The Delay-Tolerant Networking Research Group (DTNRG) is the primary group researching Delay-tolerant networking (DTN). Additional research efforts focus on various uses of the new technology.

The canceled Mars Telecommunications Orbiter had been planned to establish an Interplanetary internet link between Earth and Mars, in order to support other Mars missions. Rather than using RF, it would have used optical communications using laser beams for their higher data rates. "Lasercom sends information using beams of light and optical elements, such as telescopes and optical amplifiers, rather than RF signals, amplifiers, and antennas"

NASA JPL tested the DTN protocol with their Deep Impact Networking (DINET) experiment on board the Deep Impact/EPOXI spacecraft in October, 2008.

In May 2009, DTN was deployed to a payload on board the ISS. NASA and BioServe Space Technologies, a research group at the University of Colorado, have been continuously testing DTN on two Commercial Generic Bioprocessing Apparatus (CGBA) payloads. CGBA-4 and CGBA-5 serve as computational and communications platforms which are remotely controlled from BioServe's Payload Operations Control Center (POCC) in Boulder, CO. In October 2012 ISS Station commander Sunita Williams remotely operated Mocup (Meteron Operations and Communications Prototype), a "cat-sized" Lego Mindstorms robot fitted with a BeagleBoard computer and webcam, located in the European Space Operations Centre in Germany in an experiment using DTN. These initial experiments provide insight into future missions where DTN will enable the extension of networks into deep space to explore other planets and solar system points of interest. Seen as necessary for space exploration, DTN enables timeliness of data return from operating assets, which results in reduced risk and cost, increased crew safety, and improved operational awareness and science return for NASA and additional space agencies.

DTN has several major arenas of application, in addition to the interplanetary internet, which include sensor networks, military and tactical communications, disaster recovery, hostile environments, mobile devices, and remote outposts. As an example of a remote outpost, imagine an isolated Arctic village, or a faraway island, with electricity, one or more computers, but no communication connectivity. With the addition of a simple wireless hotspot in the village, plus DTN-enabled devices on, say, dog sleds or fishing boats, a resident would be able to check their e-mail or click on a Wikipedia article, and have their requests forwarded to the nearest networked location on the sled's or boat's next visit, and get the replies on its return.

== Earth orbit ==
Earth orbit is sufficiently nearby that conventional protocols can be used. For example, the International Space Station has been connected to the regular terrestrial internet since January 22, 2010, when the first unassisted tweet was posted. However, the space station also serves as a useful platform to develop, experiment with, and implement systems that make up the interplanetary internet. NASA and the European Space Agency (ESA) have used an experimental version of the interplanetary internet to control an educational rover, placed at the European Space Operations Centre in Darmstadt, Germany, from the International Space Station. The experiment used the DTN protocol to demonstrate technology that one day could enable internet-like communications that can support habitats or infrastructure on another planet.

== See also ==
- InterPlaNet
- Delay-tolerant networking
- Intergalactic Computer Network
- Nanonetwork
- IPFS
- LunaNet
