= CFDP =

CFDP can stand for:

- CCSDS File Delivery Protocol
- Coherent file distribution protocol
