= Mars Telecommunications Network =

Upcoming NASA Mars mission

- Names: MTN; Mars Telecommunications Orbiter
- Mission type: Mars orbiter
- Operator: NASA

Spacecraft properties
- Manufacturer: Blue Origin

Start of mission
- Launch date: TBA
- Rocket: New Glenn 7x2
- Launch site: Cape Canaveral SLC-36
- Contractor: Blue Origin

Orbital parameters
- Reference system: Areocentric
- Periareon altitude: 180 km (110 mi)
- Apoareon altitude: 4,500 km (2,800 mi)

Mars orbiter

The Mars Telecommunications Network (MTN), formerly known as the Mars Telecommunications Orbiter (MTO), is a planned Mars orbiter mission intended to provide better communication for Mars landers, rovers and other spacecraft on the surface of the planet. The MTN will additionally carry no less than 20kg of science payload, which could be CubeSats. A budget reconciliation package enacted in July 2025 requires MTN to be ready for launch by 2028.

== History ==
A dedicated communications satellite for Mars has been proposed several times in the past, including the Mars Telecommunications Orbiter, the Mars Science and Telecommunications Orbiter, and the Next Mars Orbiter (NeMO). The 2025 One Big Beautiful Bill Act allocated $700 million to develop a Mars Telecommunications Orbiter, which became the basis of the MTN. The MTN will be procured through a fixed-price contract from commercial partners who previously received funding from NASA for design studies for a Mars Sample Return Mission that proposed a telecommunications orbiter as a part of their proposed mission. That made a maximum of eight companies eligible, Aerojet Rocketdyne, Blue Origin, Lockheed Martin, Northrop Grumman, Quantum Space, Rocket Lab, SpaceX, and Whittinghill Aerospace. NASA issued a request for proposals in May 2026. On 2 September 2026, NASA awarded a contract to Blue Origin to design, develop, integrate, launch, and operate the network. MTN is expected to be in operation in Mars by 2030.

== See also ==
- Deep Space Optical Communications – Spacecraft communication system using lasers
- LightShip – Planned European interplanetary space tug supporting Mars missions
