= Scps =

SCPS may refer to:

- Savannah Christian Preparatory School
- New York University School of Continuing and Professional Studies
- Seaway Crude Pipeline System
- Seminole County Public Schools
- Society of Civil and Public Servants
- Space Communications Protocol Specifications
- Spotsylvania County Public Schools
- Soldier Plate Carrier System
- Stafford County Public Schools
- Secure, Contain, Protect (Refrencing Multiple SCP entities, or SCP-S)
