= Dalbir Bindra =

Canadian psychologist (1922–1980)

Dalbir Bindra FRSC
- Born: June 11, 1922; Rawalpindi, British India
- Died: December 31, 1980 (aged 58); Montreal, Quebec, Canada
- Education: Punjab University; McGill University; Harvard University
- Known for: Theories of motivation
- Awards: Fellow of the Royal Society of Canada
- Scientific career
- Fields: Psychology
- Workplaces: McGill University
- Thesis: Hoarding behavior of rats: nutritional and psychological factors (1947)
- Doctoral advisor: J.C.R. Licklider
- Doctoral students: Lynn Nadel

Dalbir Bindra FRSC (June 11, 1922 - December 31, 1980) was a Canadian neuropsychologist and a professor in the psychology department at McGill University (1949-1980). He is known for his contributions to the neurobiological study of motivation and behaviour and his two books on these topics; Motivation: A Systematic Reinterpretation (1959), and A Theory of Intelligent Behaviour (1976). He also served as chair of the McGill University Psychology Department (1975 - 1980).

== Early life ==
Dalbir Bindra was born in Rawalpindi, British India (now Pakistan). He had three brothers, all of whom found success in military careers: two became generals and one became an admiral.

Dalbir Bindra, known as D.B. to his close friends and students, developed an interest in experimental psychology early on while completing his B.A. at Punjab University in Lahore. He continued his studies at Harvard University, completing his M.A. in 1946 and his Ph.D. in 1948, both under the supervision of J.C.R. Licklider. At Harvard, Bindra took classes under J.G. Beebe-Center, and was influenced by other members of the faculty including Edwin Boring, Gordon Allport, and Stanley Smith Stevens. His fellow students included Virginia Sanders, Mark Rosenzweig, Jim Egan, Davis Howes, George Miller, and Leo Postman. Bindra's Ph.D. thesis research and first publications examined motivation and hoarding behaviour in rats.

== Career ==
Bindra taught for two years at American University in Washington, D.C., before joining the Psychology Department at McGill University in 1949, when Donald O. Hebb was the Department Chair of Psychology. At McGill, the core of Bindra's research examined the neurophysiology of fear and motivation and the role of the former in the latter.

Bindra's research interests included the human threshold of pain, psychopharmacology, and neuropsychology, with a specific focus on the neural correlates of intelligent behaviour. He published his second book, A Theory of Intelligent Behaviour, in 1976, describing the integration of neural processes underlying motivation and sensory-motor coordination to produce intelligent behaviour.

Bindra's Ph.D. students include Lynn Nadel, psychologist and co-author of the widely cited book, The Hippocampus As a Cognitive Map (Nadel & O'Keefe, 1978), and Roy A. Wise, emeritus scientist at the National Institute on Drug Abuse who focuses on brain mechanisms of motivation and addiction, including the role of dopamine.

Bindra was elected president of the Canadian Psychological Association in 1958. His presidential address described the relationship between experimental psychology and behaviour disorders. Bindra also served as chair of the Associate Committee on Experimental Psychology of the National Research Council of Canada from 1962 to 1968. In 1975, he was appointed the chair of the psychology department of McGill, a position he held for five years until his death on December 31, 1980, from a heart attack

== Research ==
=== Motivation ===
Bindra applied research in pharmacology and neurology to human executive functioning. He defined motivation as a dynamic interaction between biological, social, internal, and external factors. Internal factors included physiological and driving cues, and external factors included environmental stimuli. Bindra strongly felt that motivation, as a topic in psychology, could unify diverse psychological subfields that typically held conflicting ideas. Bindra was a forerunner in integrating methods and findings from both sides of the nature versus nurture debate to support his research in motivation.

His research combined a diverse set of theories and topics, including goal direction, sensory cues, arousal, blood chemistry, and reinforcement. This work culminated in the publication of his first book in 1959, Motivation: A Systematic Reinterpretation, which attempted to systematize the contemporary motivation literature within a new framework. Based on evidence from human experimental data and animal paradigms, the book explored the underlying explanations for goal-directed motivation in humans.

=== Methods in neuropsychology ===
In the late 1950s, Bindra developed novel pharmacological and neuropsychological experimental techniques for use in rats. He applied these methods to study a range of topics including intelligence, learning, exploratory behaviour, emotion, disinhibition, and habituation. These methods varied from Pavlovian conditioning paradigms to drug injections of methylphenidate and chlorpromazine in rat models. For example, one of his experiments examined the differing effects methylphenidate, chlorpromazine, and imipramine had on freezing and immobility in rats. Bindra found that these drugs decreased and altered the pattern of this response in rats, indicating a type of induced avoidance behaviour.

=== Other aspects of research ===
In his second book, 'A Theory of Intelligent Behaviour' (1976), Bindra defined intelligence as a set of adaptive, directed, anticipative, and creative behaviours intended to bring about desired outcomes. This book highlighted the many neural connections enabling cognitive knowledge, motivational arousal, and sensory motor coordination. Bindra argued that together, their interactions produced intelligence.

In a similar vein, Bindra had radical ideas regarding human learning: he rejected the typical operant conditioning theory of response-reinforcement. Instead, he argued that learning was produced by our cognitive representations of our external environments; these schemas could be influenced by context, incentive, and motivation.

Towards the end of his career, Bindra expanded his research to include psychological disorders manifesting in behavioural problems. He published papers about human weeping and language in apes in 1972 and 1981, respectively.

== Honours and awards ==
Bindra's contribution to the field of psychology has been recognized through the conferral of several honours. Elected president of the Canadian Psychological Association (CPA) from 1958 to 1959, Bindra was also a Fellow of both the CPA and the American Psychological Association. He was awarded the Canadian Centennial Medal in 1967, and in 1973 was elected a Fellow of the Royal Society of Canada, a rare honour for a psychologist.

In recognition of his teaching and research contributions to McGill's Department of Psychology, the Dalbir Bindra Fellowship was established, valued at $10,000. The Fellowship is awarded to a student in a program at the graduate level, with preference for students from developing countries
