= KioskNet =

System for providing internet access

KioskNet is a system, developed at the University of Waterloo, to provide very low cost Internet access to rural villages in developing countries, based on the concept of delay-tolerant networking. It uses vehicles, such as buses, to ferry data between village kiosks and Internet gateways in nearby urban centers. The data is re-assembled at a Proxy Server for interaction with legacy servers. The system is free and open source.

A video describing the KioskNet system can be found here, or is available on YouTube here.

== See also ==
- Srinivasan Keshav
- Delay-tolerant networking
