= Man–Computer Symbiosis =

1960 paper by J. C. R. Licklider

"Man–Computer Symbiosis" is a work by J. C. R. Licklider published on 8 August 1962. The paper contained ideas now considered fundamental to the modern computing revolution.

The work describes Licklider's vision of a complementary relationship between humans and computers at some time in the future. According to Bardini, Licklider envisioned a time when machine cognition ("cerebration") would surpass, and become independent of, human direction, as a basic stage of development within human evolution. Jacucci et al. describe Licklider's vision as the very tight coupling of human brains and computing machines.

As a prerequisite of human–computer symbiosis, Licklider conceived of a "thinking center", incorporating the functions of libraries and new developments in information technology, connected to other such centers through computer networks.

Streeter identifies the main empirical element of the work as the time and motion analysis covered Part III. In addition he identified two reasons for Licklider to have considered such a symbiotic human–computer relationship to be beneficial: firstly, that it might bring about an advantage emerging from the use of a computer, such that there are similarities with the necessary methodology of such a use (i.e. trial and error) to the methodology of problem solving through play, and secondarily, because of the advantage which results from using computers in battle situations. Foster states Licklider sought to promote computer use in order to "augment human intellect by freeing it from mundane tasks".

Streeter considers Licklider to be positing an escape from the limitations of the mode of computer use during his time, which was batch processing. Russell thinks Licklider was stimulated by an encounter with the newly developed PDP-1.

== Parts of the work ==
The work shows the following contents:

=== Part I ===
Part I is titled "Introduction" and has two sub-headings, "Symbiosis" (Part I A) and "Between 'Mechanically Extended Man' and 'Artificial Intelligence'" (Part I B).

Part I A begins by showing a definition of the term symbiosis using the illustration of the relationship between two organisms, a fig tree, and its pollinator, a type of fig wasp. The article continues to sub-classify the concept of a symbiotic relationship between humans and computers within the overall relationship between men and machines generally (human–machine systems), and outlines the intentions of its author in the possibility within the future of a relationship for the benefit of human thinking.

Part I B references J. D. North's "The rational behavior of mechanically extended man" to begin a brief discussion on "mechanically extended man" and proceeds to include developments and future developments within artificial intelligence.

=== Part II ===
Part II is titled "Aims of Man–Computer Symbiosis".

Licklider opens with the notion that the function of present-day computers is to solve pre-formulated problems, and suggests that, while the act of programming forces one to discipline and clearly articulate their thought process, the complexity of particular problems may indeed become an arduous task. Problems of this type are suggested to be solved both easier and faster “through an intuitively guided trial-and-error procedure in which the computer cooperated, turning up flaws in the reasoning or revealing unexpected turns in the solution.” Licklider goes on to reference the Henri Poincaré quote of “the question is not “what is the answer?”. The question is “what is the question?”. Further, Licklider outlines two primary aims of human–computer symbiosis: the first of which being “to bring the computing machine effectively into the formulation parts of technical problems”; the second being “to bring computing machines effectively into processes of thinking that must go on in “real time”, time that moves too fast to use computers in conventional ways”. Licklider closes with the statement of, in order to reach comparable human–computer interaction to that between two colleagues, far greater coupling between machine and man will be required than is currently technologically feasible.

=== Part III ===
Part III is titled "Need for Computer Participation in Formulative and Real-Time Thinking" and begins by continuing from a preceding statement on the likelihood of data-processing machines improving human thinking and problem solving. This part proceeds to an outline of an investigation sub-headed "A Preliminary and Informal Time-and-Motion Analysis of Technical Thinking", in which Licklider investigated his own activities during the spring and summer of 1957. This discussion includes a statement on the currently understood definition of the term computer, as "a wide class of calculating, data-processing, and information-storage-and-retrieval machines". Licklider begins a comparison between the so-called "genotypic" similarities between humans and computers, in the seventh passage of this part, with a definition of humans as:

noisy, narrow-band devices, but their nervous systems have very many parallel and simultaneously active channels

and ends with the acknowledgement of differences between inherent processing speed and use of language.

=== Part IV ===
Part IV is titled "Separable Functions of Men and Computers in the Anticipated Symbiotic Association". Licklider in the first passage of this part makes reference to the SAGE system. The text continues to identify ways in which theoretically active computers would function in ways including: to interpolate, extrapolate, convert static equations or logical statements into dynamic models. The part concludes with a statement of the functioning of a potential computer as performing diagnosis, pattern-matching, and relevance-recognizing.

=== Part V ===
Part V is the final part of the article and is titled "Prerequisites for Realization of Man–Computer Symbiosis". It has five sub-headings:

1. "Speed Mismatch Between Men and Computers"
2. "Memory Hardware Requirements"
3. "Memory Organization Requirements"
4. "The Language Problem"
5. "Input and Output Equipment"

Part V C mentions the concept of trie memory.

Part V D begins by surveying the differences between human language and computer language, mentioning as examples of the latter: FORTRAN; the "Information Processing Language" of Cliff Shaw, Allen Newell, Herbert A. Simon, and T. O. Ellis; and ALGOL "and related systems". Licklider says:

instructions directed to computers specify courses; instructions directed to human beings specify goals.

Licklider says that a challenge is to program computers to devise their own procedures for achieving human-specified goals.

Part V E ends with a discussion of equipment for "more effective, immediate man–machine communication than can be achieved with an electric typewriter", including desk-surface display and control, large wall display, and automatic speech production and recognition.

== References of "Man–Computer Symbiosis" ==
At the time, acoustics represented one way a number of budding computer scientists entered the field. The work references 26 studies, of which fourteen are concerning acoustic studies and related areas of investigation, and fifteen on computing and studies related to this, including four related to studies on the subject of chess.

== IRE Transactions ==
Institute of Radio Engineers (IRE) Transactions ceased publishing during 1962, and is now published instead as IEEE Transactions on Systems, Man, and Cybernetics: Systems, IEEE Transactions on Cybernetics, and IEEE Transactions on Human–Machine Systems.

== Later developments ==
During August 1962, Licklider and Welden Clark joint published "On-Line Man–Computer Communication".

MIT published a paper during 1966, written by Warren Teitelman, entitled "Pilot: A Step Towards Man–Computer Symbiosis".

At the time of the publication of one paper, during 2004, there were very few computer applications known to the authors, which exhibited the qualities of computers identified by Licklider within his 1960 article, of being human-like with respect to being collaboratory and possessing the ability to communicate in human like ways. As part of their paper, the authors (Lesh et al.) mention a discussion of prototypes under development by the Mitsubishi Electric Research Laboratories.

== See also ==
- Symbiosis
- History of the Internet § Inspiration
- Darwin among the Machines
- Electronics
- Douglas Engelbart
- GOAL agent programming language
- Human factors integration
- Intelligence amplification
