= J. C. R. Licklider =

American psychologist and computer scientist (1915-1990)

Joseph Carl Robnett Licklider
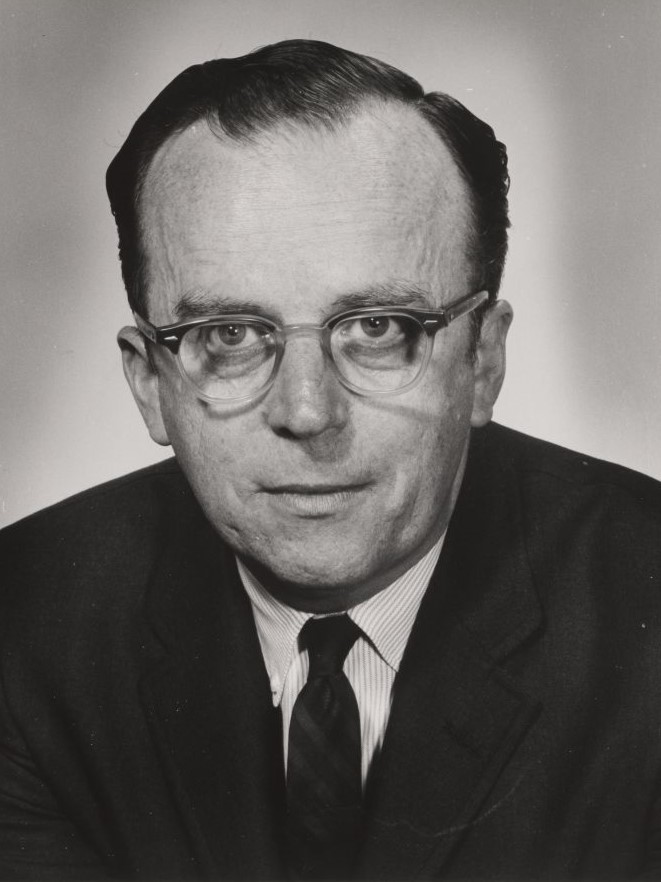
- Born: March 11, 1915; St. Louis, Missouri, U.S.
- Died: June 26, 1990 (aged 75); Arlington, Massachusetts, U.S.
- Other names: J. C. R Lick "Computing's Johnny Appleseed"
- Known for: Cybernetics/Interactive computing "Intergalactic Computer Network" (Internet); Artificial Intelligence; Psychoacoustics
- Spouse: Louise Carpenter
- Children: 2

Academic background
- Education: Washington University in St. Louis; University of Rochester

Academic work
- Doctoral students: Dalbir Bindra
- Influenced: Jerome I. Elkind

Joseph Carl Robnett Licklider (/ˈlɪklaɪdər/; March 11, 1915 – June 26, 1990), known simply as J. C. R. or "Lick", was an American psychologist and computer scientist who is considered to be among the most prominent figures in computer science development and general computing history.

He is particularly remembered for being one of the first to foresee modern-style interactive computing and its application to all manner of activities; and also as an Internet pioneer with an early vision of a worldwide computer network long before it was built. He did much to initiate this by funding research that led to significant advances in computing technology, including today's canonical graphical user interface, and the ARPANET, which is the direct predecessor of the Internet.

Robert Taylor, founder of Xerox PARC's Computer Science Laboratory and Digital Equipment Corporation's Systems Research Center, noted that "most of the significant advances in computer technology—including the work that my group did at Xerox PARC—were simply extrapolations of Lick's vision. They were not really new visions of their own. So he was really the father of it all".

== Biography ==
Licklider was born on March 11, 1915, in St. Louis, Missouri. He was the only child of Joseph Parron Licklider, a Baptist minister, and Margaret Robnett Licklider. Despite his father's religious background, he was not religious in later life.

He studied at Washington University in St. Louis, where he received a B.A. with a triple major in physics, mathematics, and psychology in 1937 and an M.A. in psychology in 1938. He received a Ph.D. in psychoacoustics from the University of Rochester in 1942 as well as a Doctorate in Psychology from the University of Rochester, that same year. Thereafter he worked at Harvard University as a research fellow and lecturer in the Psycho-Acoustic Laboratory from 1943 to 1950.

He became interested in information technology, and moved to MIT in 1950 as an associate professor, where he served on a committee that established the MIT Lincoln Laboratory and a psychology program for engineering students. While at MIT, Licklider was involved in the SAGE project as head of the team concerned with human factors. In 1957, he received the Franklin V. Taylor Award from the Society of Engineering Psychologists. In 1958, he was elected President of the Acoustical Society of America, and in 1990 he received the Commonwealth Award for Distinguished Service.

Licklider left MIT to become a vice president at Bolt Beranek and Newman (BBN) in 1957. He learned about time-sharing from Christopher Strachey at a UNESCO-sponsored conference on Information Processing in Paris in 1959. At BBN, he developed the BBN Time-Sharing System and conducted the first public demonstration of time-sharing.

In October 1962, Licklider was appointed head of the Information Processing Techniques Office (IPTO) at ARPA, the United States Department of Defense Advanced Research Projects Agency, an appointment he kept through July 1964. In April 1963, he sent a memo to his colleagues in outlining the early challenges presented in establishing a time-sharing network of computers with the software of that time. Ultimately his vision led to ARPANET, the precursor of today's Internet.

After serving as manager of information sciences, systems and applications at IBM's Thomas J. Watson Research Center in Yorktown Heights, New York from 1964 to 1967, Licklider rejoined MIT as a professor of electrical engineering in 1968. During this period, he concurrently served as director of Project MAC until 1971. Project MAC had produced the first computer time-sharing system, CTSS, and one of the first online setups with the development of Multics (work on which commenced in 1964). Multics provided inspiration for some elements of the Unix operating system developed at Bell Labs by Ken Thompson and Dennis Ritchie in 1970.

Following a second stint as IPTO director (1974–1975), his MIT faculty line was transferred to the Institute's Laboratory for Computer Science, where he was based for the remainder of his career. He was a founding member of Infocom in 1979, known for their interactive fiction computer games. He retired and became professor emeritus in 1985. He died in 1990 in Arlington, Massachusetts; his cremated remains are interred in Mount Auburn Cemetery.

== Work ==
=== Psychoacoustics ===
In the psychoacoustics field, Licklider is most remembered for his 1951 "Duplex Theory of Pitch Perception", presented in a paper which has been cited hundreds of times, was reprinted in a 1979 book, and formed the basis for modern models of pitch perception. He was also the first to report binaural unmasking of speech.

=== Semi-Automatic Ground Environment ===
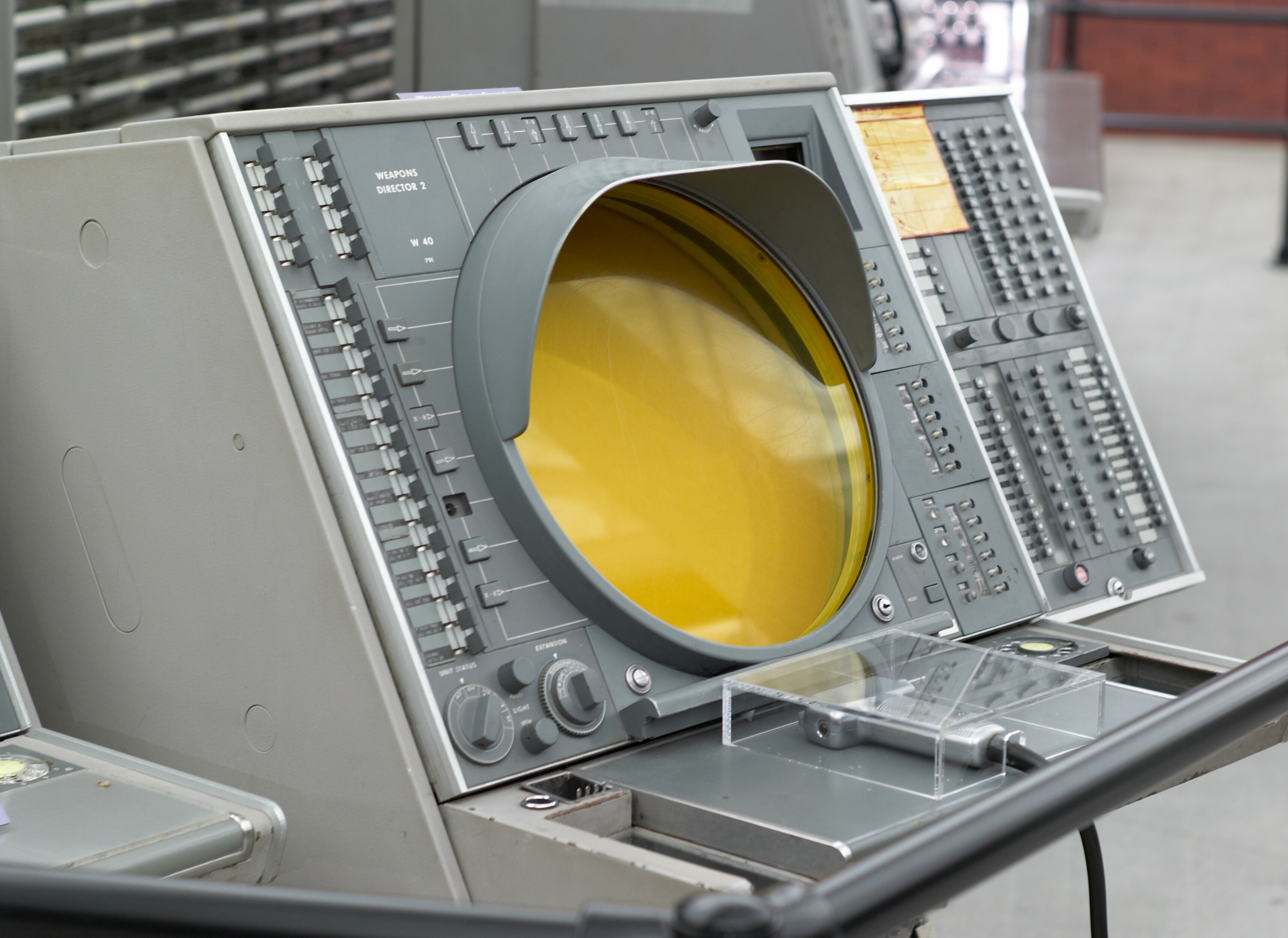
A SAGE operator's terminal

While at MIT in the 1950s, Licklider worked on Semi-Automatic Ground Environment (SAGE), a Cold War project to create a computer-aided air defense system. The SAGE system included computers that collected and presented data to a human operator, who then chose the appropriate response. He worked as a human factors expert, which helped convince him of the great potential for human/computer interfaces.

=== Information technology ===
Licklider became interested in information technology early in his career. His ideas foretold of graphical computing, point-and-click interfaces, digital libraries, e-commerce, online banking, and software that would exist on a network and migrate wherever it was needed. Much like Vannevar Bush's, Licklider's contribution to the development of the Internet consists of ideas, not inventions. He foresaw the need for networked computers with easy user interfaces.

Licklider was instrumental in conceiving, funding and managing the research that led to modern personal computers and the Internet. In 1960 his seminal paper on "Man-Computer Symbiosis" foreshadowed interactive computing, and he went on to fund early efforts in time-sharing and application development, most notably the work of Douglas Engelbart, who founded the Augmentation Research Center at Stanford Research Institute and created the famous On-Line System where the computer mouse was invented. He also did some seminal early work for the Council on Library Resources, imagining what libraries of the future might look like, which he describes as "thinking centers" in his 1960 paper.

==== Man–computer symbiosis ====
In "Man-Computer Symbiosis", Licklider in 1960 outlined the need for simpler interaction between computers and computer users. Licklider has been credited as an early pioneer of cybernetics and artificial intelligence (AI), but unlike other AI practitioners, he never felt sure that men would be replaced by computer-based beings. As he wrote in the article: "Men will set the goals, formulate the hypotheses, determine the criteria, and perform the evaluations. Computing machines will do the routinizable work that must be done to prepare the way for insights and decisions in technical and scientific thinking". He goes on to write in the same article: "In short, it seems worthwhile to avoid argument with (other) enthusiasts for artificial intelligence by conceding dominance in the distant future of cerebration to machines alone". This approach, focusing on effective use of information technology in augmenting human intelligence, is sometimes called Intelligence amplification (IA). Peter Highnam, DARPA director in 2020, focused on human-machine partnership as a long-term goal and guiding light ever since Licklider's 1960 publication.

==== Project MAC ====
During his time as director of ARPA's Information Processing Techniques Office (IPTO) from 1962 to 1964, he funded Project MAC at MIT. A large mainframe computer was designed to be shared by up to 30 simultaneous users, each sitting at a separate "typewriter terminal". He also funded similar projects at Stanford University, UCLA, UC Berkeley (called Project Genie), and the AN/FSQ-32 at System Development Corporation. This time-sharing technology later developed to become what today are known as servers.

==== Global computer network ====
Licklider played a similar role in conceiving of and funding early networking research. He formulated the earliest ideas of a global computer network in August 1962 at BBN, in a series of memos discussing the "Intergalactic Computer Network" concept. These ideas contained almost everything that the Internet is today, including cloud computing.

While at IPTO he convinced Ivan Sutherland, Bob Taylor, and Lawrence G. Roberts that an all-encompassing computer network was a very important concept. He met with Donald Davies in 1965 and inspired his interest in data communications.

In 1967 Licklider submitted the paper "Televistas: Looking ahead through side windows" to the Carnegie Commission on Educational Television. This paper describes a radical departure from the "broadcast" model of television. Instead Licklider advocates for a two-way communications network. The Carnegie Commission led to the creation of the Corporation for Public Broadcasting. Although the Commission's report explains that "Dr. Licklider's paper was completed after the Commission had formulated its own conclusions," President Johnson said at the signing of the Public Broadcasting Act of 1967, "So I think we must consider new ways to build a great network for knowledge—not just a broadcast system, but one that employs every means of sending and of storing information that the individual can use".

His 1968 paper The Computer as a Communication Device illustrates his vision of network applications and predicts the use of computer networks to support communities of common interest and collaboration without regard to location.

In the same 1968 paper, J. C. R. Licklider and Robert W. Taylor wrote, "Take any problem worthy of the name, and you find only a few people who can contribute effectively to its solution. Those people must be brought into close intellectual partnership so that their ideas can come into contact with one another. But bring these people together physically in one place to form a team, and you have trouble, for the most creative people are often not the best team players, and there are not enough top positions in a single organization to keep them all happy." (Evan Herbert edited the article and acted as intermediary during its writing between Licklider in Boston and Taylor in Washington.)

The Licklider Transmission Protocol is named after him.

== Publications ==
Licklider wrote numerous articles and lectures, and one book:

- 1942. An Electrical Investigation of Frequency-Localization in the Auditory Cortex of the Cat. Ph.D. Thesis University of Rochester
- 1965. Libraries of the future. Cambridge, Mass., M.I.T. Press (alternative online source)

Articles, a selection:

- 1960. "Man-Computer Symbiosis". In: Transactions on Human Factors in Electronics, volume HFE-1, pp. 4–11, March 1960.
- 1963. "Memorandum for Members and Affiliates of the Intergalactic Computer Network". Advanced Research Projects Agency, April 23, 1963.
- 1965. "Man-Computer Partnership". In: International Science and Technology May 1965.
- 1967. "Televistas: Looking ahead through side windows". Report of the Carnegie Commission on Public Television, 1967, pp. 201–225.
- Licklider, J.C.R. (January 9, 1967). "Computers Are Helping Scientists Locate That Particular Pebble in the New Avalanche of Information". The New York Times.
- 1968. "The Computer as a Communication Device". In: Science and Technology. April 1968.

== See also ==
- List of pioneers in computer science
