= Space Internetworking Center =

Greek research center

- Established: September 2010
- Head: Prof. Vassilis Tsaoussidis
- Staff: 27 members
- Budget: €1.5 million (estimated)
- Location: Xanthi, Greece
- Website: www.spice-center.org

Space Internetworking Center (SPICE) (Greek: Κέντρο Διαστημικής Διαδικτύωσης) in Xanthi, Greece, was founded in September 2010, having acquired funding from FP-7 Research Potential programme (FP7-REGPOT-2010-1, Grant Agreement No 264226). The center currently is directed by Prof. Vassilis Tsaoussidis and employs 27 staff members. It is hosted by the Democritus University of Thrace. The center has built an alliance with major institutions such as the Massachusetts Institute of Technology, NASA, Aalto University, the European Space Agency, and the University of Cambridge.

Among the areas of interest of the organisation are space internetworking, delay-tolerant networking, energy-efficient communications, the integration of things onto the new Internet, and the routing, transporting and application of network protocols.

== Research agenda ==
The main research goals of SPICE are:

1. The design of space protocols that can dynamically adapt to topology changes and communications anomalies, achieving high-rate of data transmission, even in deep-space missions.
2. The interoperability between different communication protocols, e.g. protocols used by ESA and NASA.
3. The dynamic and optimized dissemination of space data to interested institutes and organizations.
4. The utilization of space communications for terrestrial applications, e.g. emergency situations.
5. The unification of space and terrestrial internetworking communications.
6. The deployment of delay tolerant networking for the benefit of terrestrial applications. Examples are energy-saving architectures, social networking, etc.
