= Srinivasan Keshav =

Canadian computer scientist

Srinivasan Keshav FRSC
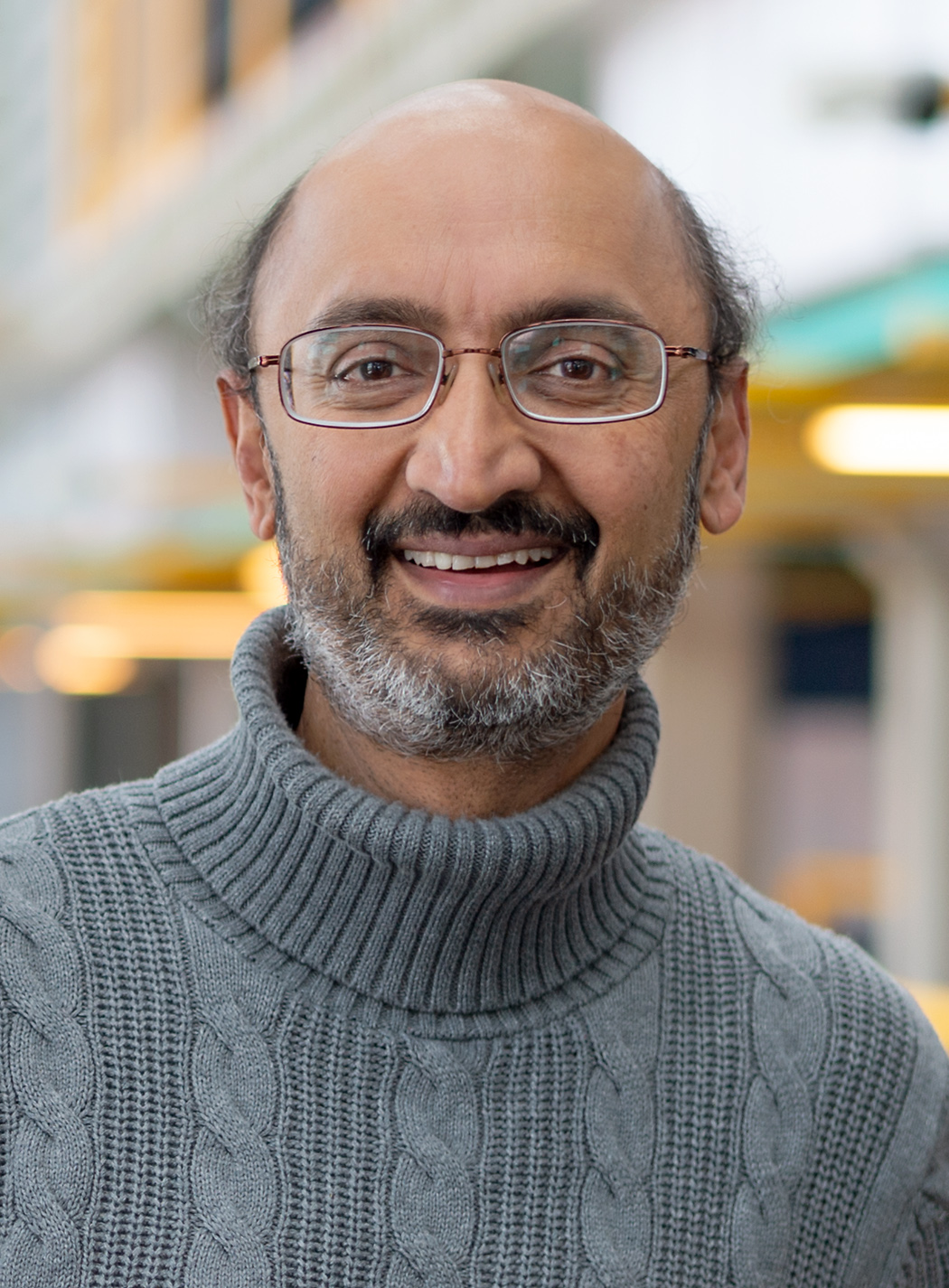
- Born: 1965 (age 60–61)
- Citizenship: US, Canada and Great Britain
- Education: University of California, Berkeley (PhD 1991); Indian Institute of Technology, Delhi (B.Tech 1986)
- Awards: ACM Fellow (2012); Sloan Fellowship (1997-1999); David J. Sakrison Memorial Prize, UC Berkeley 1991-1992
- Scientific career
- Fields: Computer science
- Workplaces: University of Cambridge; University of Waterloo; Ensim Corporation; Cornell University; Bell Labs
- Thesis: Congestion Control in Computer Networks (1991)
- Doctoral advisor: Domenico Ferrari
- Website: www.cst.cam.ac.uk/~sk818

Srinivasan Keshav FRSC is a computer scientist who is currently the Robert Sansom Professor of Computer Science at the University of Cambridge.

== Biography ==
After undergraduate studies at the Indian Institute of Technology, Delhi in 1986, he received his PhD in 1991 from the University of California, Berkeley, with a thesis entitled Congestion Control in Computer Networks. His advisor was Domenico Ferrari. He then joined the research staff at Bell Labs, where he also had visiting faculty positions at IIT Delhi and Columbia University. In 1996 he became an associate professor at Cornell University; he then left academia in 1999 to co-found Ensim Corporation. In 2003, he joined the faculty at the University of Waterloo, where he held a Canada Research Chair in Tetherless Computing from 2004 to 2014 and a Cisco Systems Chair in Smart Grid from 2012 to 2017.

He is the inventor, along with his students at the University of Waterloo, of KioskNet, a system for providing internet access in impoverished countries. He has been co-director of the Information Systems and Science for Energy (ISS4E) Laboratory at the University of Waterloo since 2010. At the University of Cambridge, Professor Keshav continues to work on research and teach in areas related to sustainable energy.

== Academic works and affiliations ==
Keshav is the author of a textbook on computer networks, An Engineering Approach to Computer Networking. In 2012, he wrote Mathematical Foundations of Computer Networking.

Keshav was the Editor of Computer Communication Review from 2008 to 2013 and the Chair of ACM SIGCOMM from 2013 to 2017.

== Honors and awards ==
- David Sakrison Memorial Prize, UC Berkeley (1992)
- Sloan Fellowship (1997-1999)
- ACM Fellow (2012)

"For contributions to computer communication networks and systems."

- IEEE Fellow (2019)
- IIT Delhi Distinguished Alumni Award (2019)
- Fellow, Royal Society of Canada, 2019
- Fellow of the Royal Society, 2026
