= Mars Telecommunications Orbiter =

Cancelled Mars mission

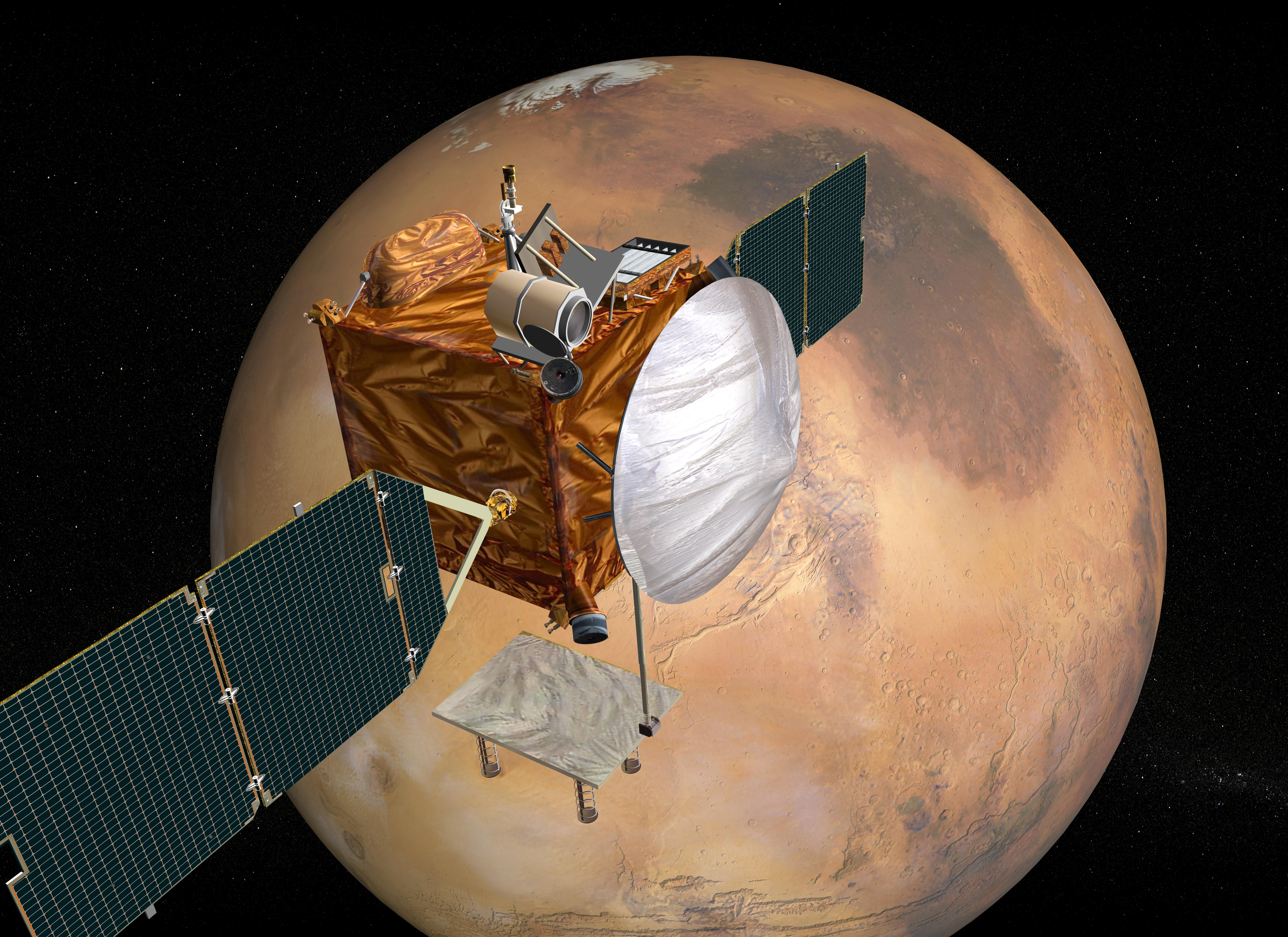
- Mission type: Planetary science, Mars exploration
- Operator: NASA
- Website: JPL's MTO web page at the Wayback Machine (archived 24 September 2005)

Start of mission
- Launch date: TBA
- Rocket: Atlas V(401) or a Delta-4M.
- Contractor: JPL

Orbital parameters
- Semi-major axis: 5,000 km (3,106.9 mi)
- Optical Communications Payload: - demonstrate laser communication in space; Narrow Angle Camera:- Support canister detection; Orbiting Sample Demonstration Canister: - Technology demonstration

The Mars Telecommunications Orbiter (MTO) was a planned Mars orbiter mission intended to provide better communication for Mars landers, rovers and other spacecraft on the surface of the planet.

== History ==
The Mars Telecommunications Orbiter (MTO) was a cancelled Mars mission that was originally intended to launch in 2009 and would have established an Interplanetary Internet between Earth and Mars. The spacecraft would have arrived in a high orbit above Mars in 2010 and relayed data packets to Earth from a variety of Mars landers, rovers and orbiters for as long as ten years, at an extremely high data rate. Such a dedicated communications satellite was thought to be necessary due to the vast quantity of scientific information to be sent to Earth by landers such as the Mars Science Laboratory.

On 21 July 2005, it was announced that MTO had been canceled due to the need to support other short-term goals, including a Hubble servicing mission, Mars Exploration Rover extended mission operations, launching Mars Science Laboratory in 2009, and to prevent Earth science mission Glory from being cancelled.

The Mars Telecommunications Orbiter would have carried a Mars Laser Communication Demonstration to demonstrate laser communication in space (optical communications), instead of usual radiowaves. "Lasercom sends information using beams of light and optical elements, such as telescopes and optical amplifiers, rather than RF signals, amplifiers, and antennas." The MTO would have had two 15 W X-band radio transmitters, and two Ka-band radio transmitters (35 W operational, and 100 W experimental).

=== Proposed successors ===
After the cancellation, a broader mission was proposed as the Mars Science and Telecommunications Orbiter. However, this mission was soon criticized as lacking well-defined parameters and objectives. Another mission, the 2013 Mars Science Orbiter, had also been proposed, though it would never be carried out.

The communications capability provided by the Mars Reconnaissance Orbiter and Mars Express science missions has proven substantial, demonstrating that dedicated relay satellites may be unnecessary in the near future. The two newest science orbiters are the MAVEN, which arrived to Mars on 21 September 2014, with an Electra transceiver; and the 2016 European ExoMars Trace Gas Orbiter, that also carries an Electra UHF band transceiver. However, these orbiters follow science orbits that are not designed for relay communications.

In 2014, there was a concern in NASA that the currently used relay satellite, Mars Odyssey, may fail, resulting in the need to press MAVEN science orbiter into use as the backup telecommunications relay, however, the highly elliptical orbit of MAVEN would limit its usefulness as a relay for operating landers on the surface.

In 2018, a Next Mars Orbiter (NeMO) was proposed by NASA. NeMO is to be a dedicated telecommunications orbiter with a robust science package, which was expected to launch in 2022. It was anticipated to employ a laser communication subsystem, that was successfully tested aboard the Lunar Atmosphere and Dust Environment Explorer (LADEE) mission in 2013. This project is currently on hiatus as of 2025.

=== Revival ===
In 2025, the One Big Beautiful Bill Act allocated $700 million to develop a Mars Telecommunications Orbiter, which was subsequently renamed the Mars Telecommunications Network (MTN). The MTN will be procured through a fixed-price contact from commercial partners. NASA issued a request for proposals in May 2026. On 2 September 2026, NASA awarded a contract to Blue Origin to design, develop, integrate, launch, and operate the network. MTN is expected to be in operation in Mars by 2030.

== See also ==
- Laser space communication
- Laser Communications Relay Demonstration – NASA payload launched in 2021
- Optical PAyload for Lasercomm Science – 2014 ISS instrument to test laser downlink (OPALS)
- Deep Space Optical Communications – Spacecraft communication system using lasers
