= Instant payment notification =

Illustration of how IPN messages from PayPal works

Instant payment notification (IPN) is a method for online retailers to automatically track purchases and other server-to-server communication in real time. This allows E-commerce systems the opportunity to store payment transactions, order information and other sales internally. IPN messages can represent payment success or failures, order transaction status changes, accounting ledger information and many others depending on the payment gateway.

The payments industry is an evolving market, technology like IPN and instant payment are now used in the retail market and in the domestic sphere, but they are expected to evolve into the corporate, business-to-business (B2B) segment and cross-border space.

== How it works ==
IPN is used by merchant to automate backend functions related to: the end user account creation, order tracking, customer and merchant notifications related to acquired services. When an E-commerce system requests a resource from a payment gateway, like a new invoice or bill for goods, the request must contain a URL endpoint representing a script or program to handle returning notifications. IPN messages are then sent to the retailer's E-commerce system by HTTP POST as the resource is updated by the gateway.

The IPN handler usually performs standard actions like validating the message, updating inventory levels in the E-commerce system, notifying customers of successful or failed payments, etc. Depending on the retailer's business requirements and the level of sophistication of the E-commerce software, some or all of the IPN messages can be handled or ignored.

Server-side scripting languages such as PHP and ASP that power most E-commerce systems are event driven and make no distinction between a user-generated event or a machine-generated event. Utilizing this fact, IPN messages facilitate the coordination of the order state changes between the ecommerce system and the payment gateway handling the order.

== See also ==
- Mobile commerce
- Comparison of shopping cart software
- Digital economy
- Electronic bill payment
- Electronic money
- E-commerce credit card payment system
- Comparison of free software e-commerce web application frameworks
- Non-store retailing
- Online marketplace
- Paid content
- Payments as a service
- Instant payment
