= Intergalactic Computer Network =

Computer networking concept

Intergalactic Computer Network or Galactic Network (IGCN) was a computer networking concept similar to today's Internet.

J.C.R. Licklider, the first director of the Information Processing Techniques Office (IPTO) at The Pentagon's ARPA, used the term in the early 1960s to refer to a networking system he "imagined as an electronic commons open to all, 'the main and essential medium of informational interaction for governments, institutions, corporations, and individuals.'" An office memorandum he sent to his colleagues in 1963 was addressed to "Members and Affiliates of the Intergalactic Computer Network". As head of IPTO from 1962 to 1964, "Licklider initiated three of the most important developments in information technology: the creation of computer science departments at several major universities, time-sharing, and networking."

Licklider first learned about time-sharing from Christopher Strachey at the inaugural UNESCO Information Processing Conference in Paris in 1959.

By the late 1960s, his promotion of the concept had inspired a primitive version of his vision called ARPANET. ARPANET expanded into a network of networks in the 1970s that became the Internet.

== See also ==
- History of the Internet
