= Next Mars Orbiter =

Proposed NASA Mars communications satellite

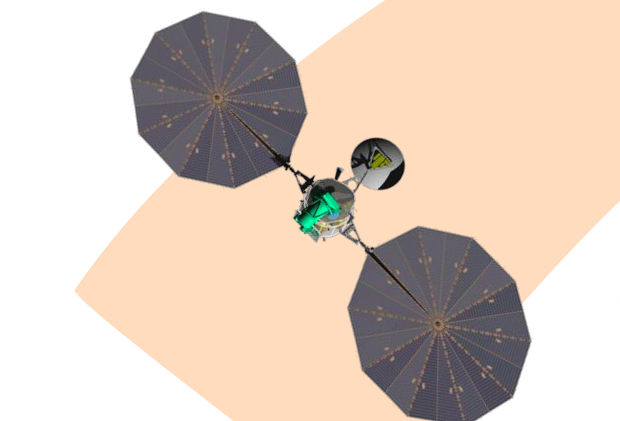
- This proposed telecommunications orbiter features ion thrusters and improved solar arrays.
- Names: NeMO; Mars 2022
- Mission type: Mars orbiter / Telecommunications
- Operator: NASA
- Mission duration: Planned: 6.5 years

Spacecraft properties
- Launch mass: 1,900 kg (4,200 lb)
- Dry mass: 1,300 kg (2,900 lb)
- Payload mass: 50 kg (110 lb)
- Power: 20 kW solar arrays

Start of mission
- Launch date: On hiatus
- Rocket: Falcon 9 or Atlas V-411

Mars orbiter

Orbital parameters
- Periareion altitude: 320 km (200 mi)
- Inclination: 75°–93° (polar orbit)

The Next Mars Orbiter (NeMO, earlier known as the Mars 2022 orbiter) is a proposed NASA Mars communications satellite with high-resolution imaging payload and two solar-electric ion thrusters.

The orbiter was initially proposed to be launched in September 2022 to link ground controllers with rovers and landers and extend mapping capabilities expected to be lost when the Mars Reconnaissance Orbiter and 2001 Mars Odyssey stop functioning, but officials elected to focus on flying the Perseverance rover first to cache various samples for a later NASA-ESA Mars Sample Return that will incorporate a Mars telecom orbiter, now envisioned for the late 2020s.

== Features ==
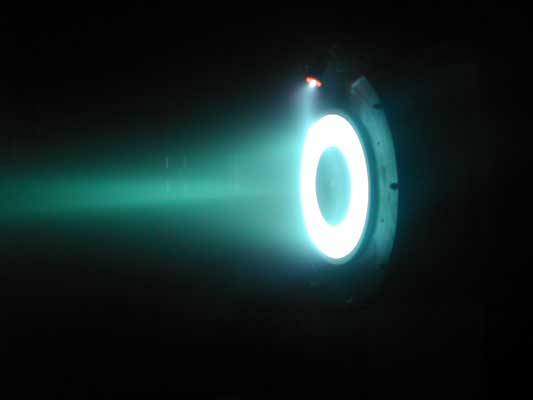
2 kW Ion thruster in operation as part of the Hall Thruster Experiment at the Princeton Plasma Physics Laboratory.

Key features under study include solar electric ion drive engines, better solar arrays, and broadband laser communications (optic communication) between Earth and Mars.

The orbiter is conceptually similar to the Mars Telecommunications Orbiter, canceled in 2005, and could be a technology precursor for a future round-trip sample return mission and human expeditions to Mars. Robert Lock is leading the concept studies for the 2022 orbiter.

Concern in NASA is that the currently used relay satellites, 2001 Mars Odyssey and Mars Reconnaissance Orbiter, may stop functioning, resulting in the need to press the MAVEN science orbiter into use as a backup telecommunications relay. Since the highly elliptical orbit of MAVEN limits its usefulness as a relay for surface operations, NASA will lower its orbit from 6,200 (3,900) to between 4,000 and 4,500 kilometers (2,500 and 2,800 mi) altitude, where it can serve as a relay while continuing its science mission.

Another suggested feature under study is "the sample rendezvous capture and return capability". The samples cached by the Mars 2020 rover would be placed in Mars orbit by a future Mars ascent vehicle. From there, the orbiter would rendezvous, transfer the samples into a capsule and send it back to Earth.

=== Propulsion ===
The proposed orbiter would be propelled with two solar-electric ion thrusters; one engine would be active while the other one would be a spare. Electrical power to the engines would be provided by advanced solar arrays that generate 20 kW.

An ion engine would give the spacecraft significant orbital flexibility for long-term support of future missions, opportunistic flybys of Phobos and Deimos, as well as the added capability of orbit support—rendezvous and capture—for a sample return mission. An ion engine would also allow access to multiple latitudes and altitudes to optimise relay contacts.

=== Suggested payload ===
- Broadband laser communications (optic communication) between Earth and Mars
- High resolution imager (30 cm/pixel)
- Potential for rendezvous and capture of soil samples
- Water ice detection and mapping
- Potential for additional instruments from international partners

== Proposed sample return ==
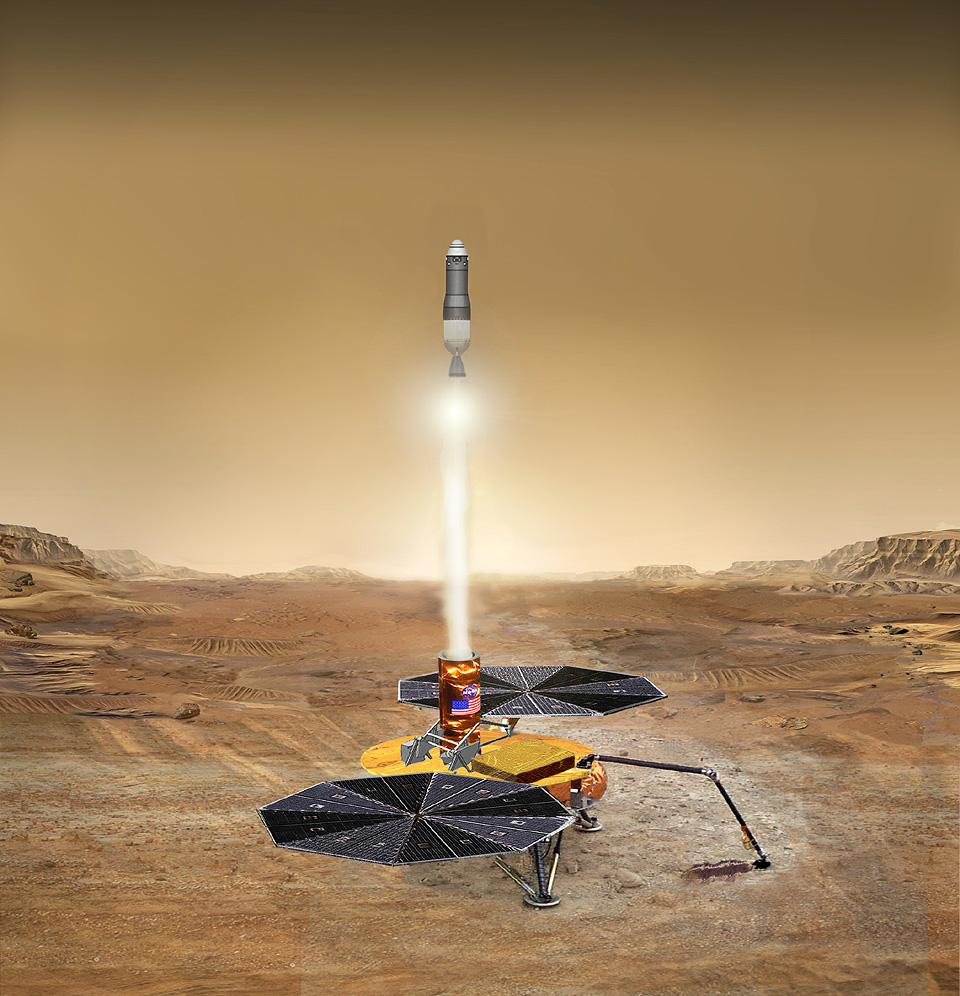
Sample return concept of the Mars ascent vehicle (MAV)

The orbiter mission has been suggested by the Planetary Science Decadal Survey to be one of three missions of the proposed Mars Sample Return (MSR) campaign. Samples would be collected and cached by the Mars 2020 mission and would be left on the surface of Mars for possible later retrieval. The orbiter would be launched on a medium-class vehicle, reaching Mars in about nine months and set to aerobrake down to a 500 km (310 mi) circular orbit over six to nine months.

The third mission of the proposed MSR campaign, the lander, would nominally be launched two years after the orbiter launch. The lander would deploy a "fetch rover" to retrieve the sample caches. A container holding the samples would be launched by a two-stage, solid-fueled Mars ascent vehicle (MAV) and placed in a 500 kilometres (310 mi) orbit comparable with the new orbiter and perform a rendezvous while in Mars orbit. The container would be transferred to an Earth entry vehicle (EEV) which would bring it to Earth, enter the atmosphere under a parachute and hard-land for retrieval and analyses in specially designed safe laboratories.

== Status ==
Some NASA officials consider the Mars 2022 orbiter an "essential orbital support for sample return", "significant" in maintaining the Martian communications infrastructure, and desirable for the continuity in remote sensing. The President's FY2017 Budget provided $10 million to begin early conceptual work on the proposed Mars orbiter. In July 2016, the Jet Propulsion Laboratory awarded five $400,000 sub-contracts to conduct concept studies. The five engineering companies are Boeing, Lockheed Martin Space Systems, Northrop Grumman Aerospace Systems, Orbital ATK, and Space Systems/Loral.

However, in August 2017, Jim Green of NASA's Planetary Science Division stated that a 2022 launch for the orbiter was "probably off the table", as it would be too difficult to assemble an orbiter with all of the desired features in that time frame. Jim Watzin of NASA's Mars Exploration Program stated in September 2017 that the orbiter may have to be cancelled, citing that "the likelihood of all of the relay orbiters failing is so low that no more investments are needed for that purpose."

In February 2018, NASA announced that it was moving ahead with plans to alter the orbit of the MAVEN orbiter to have it serve as a communications relay. It will be lowered to 4,000–4,500 kilometers (2,500–2,800 mi) altitude, where it can serve as a relay while allowing it to continue its science mission. In March 2018, NASA officials decided that the ageing Mars Reconnaissance Orbiter (MRO) will be managed such that it will continue service for about ten more years, and the program will now focus its resources on flying a sample-return mission first. The 2001 Mars Odyssey orbiter will also be managed to continue operating until about 2025. A new Mars relay orbiter is likely to take part in the sample-return architecture envisioned for the late 2020s.

== See also ==
- ExoMars Trace Gas Orbiter
- Laser communication in space
- List of missions to Mars
