= Coherent file distribution protocol =

Coherent File Distribution Protocol (CFDP) is an IETF-documented experimental protocol intended for high-speed one-to-many file transfers. Class 1 is assured delivery, class 2 is blind unassured delivery.
