= Space Communications Protocol Specifications =

International protocol

The Space Communications Protocol Specifications (SCPS) are a set of extensions to existing protocols and new protocols developed by the Consultative Committee for Space Data Systems (CCSDS) to improve performance of Internet protocols in space environments. The SCPS protocol stack consists of:

- SCPS-FP—A set of extensions to FTP to make it more bit efficient and to add advanced features such as record update within a file and integrity checking on file transfers
- SCPS-TP—A set of TCP options and sender-side modifications to improve TCP performance in stressed environments including long delays, high bit error rates, and significant asymmetries. The SCPS-TP options are TCP options registered with the Internet Assigned Numbers Authority (IANA) and hence SCPS-TP is compatible with other well-behaved TCP implementations.
- SCPS-SP—A security protocol comparable to IPsec
- SCPS-NP—A bit-efficient network protocol analogous to, but not interoperable with, IP
